= Imam Reza Shrine =

Tomb in Mashhad, Iran

Imam Reza shrine
- حرمِ امام رضا
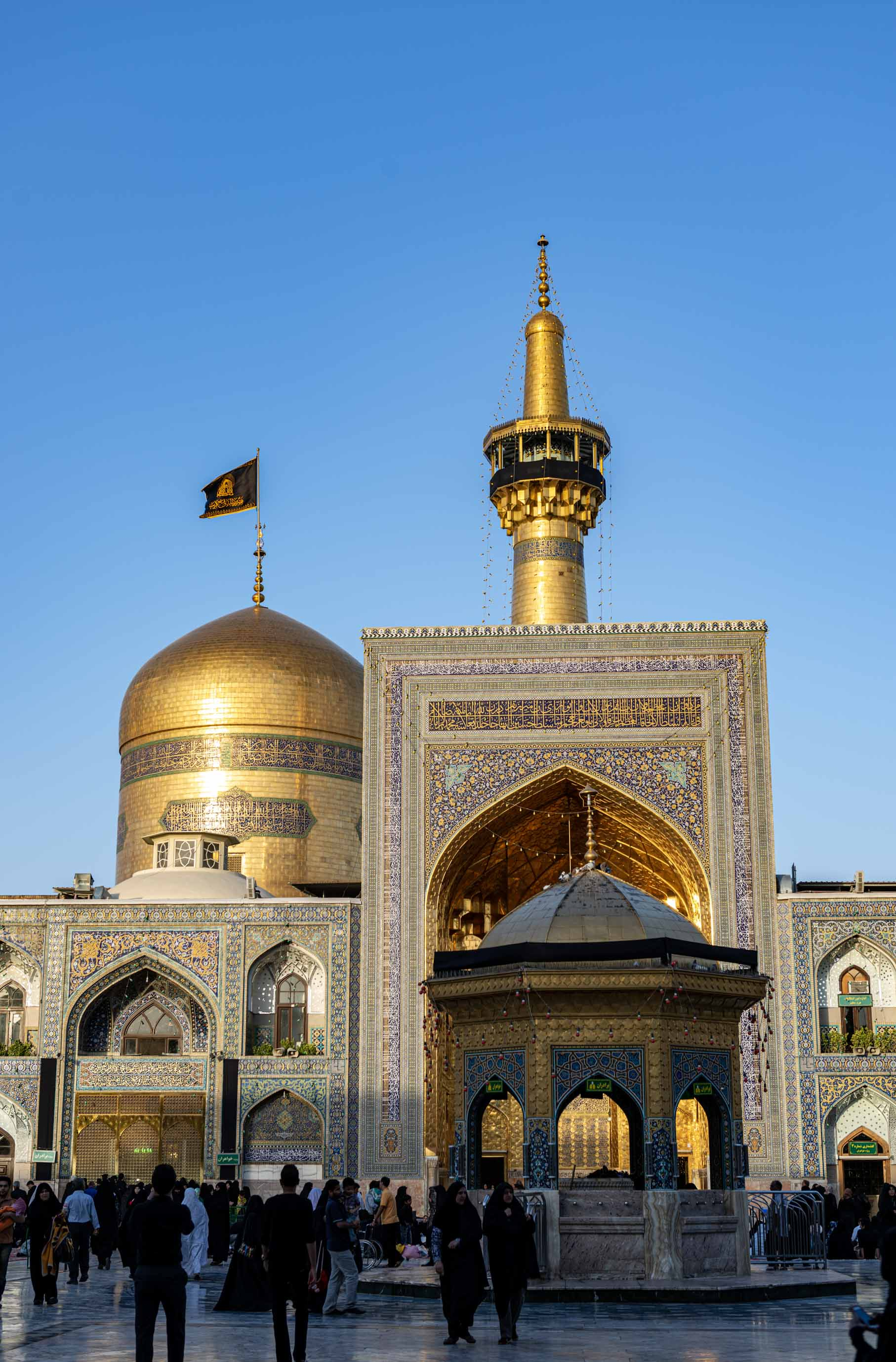
- The dome, iwan, minaret, Saqakhaneh and the Window of Steel from the Enghelab Courtyard.

- Location of the shrine complex in Iran

Religion
- Affiliation: Shia Islam
- Ecclesiastical or organisational status: Shrine and mausoleum complex
- Leadership: Ahmad Alamolhoda (imam)
- Status: Active

Location
- Location: Mashhad, Razavi Khorasan province
- Country: Iran
- Interactive map of Imam Reza shrine
- Administration: Astan Quds Razavi
- Coordinates: 36°17′17″N 59°36′57″E

Architecture
- Type: Persian-Islamic architecture
- Style: Abbasid; Timurid; Safavid; Qajar
- Completed: 818 CE

Specifications
- Capacity: 700,000 worshippers
- Dome: Two (maybe more)
- Minaret: 12
- Minaret height: 70 m (230 ft)
- Site area: 1,200,000 square meters

Website
- aqr.ir (in Persian)

Iran National Heritage List
- Official name: Imam Reza Shrine
- Type: Shrine
- Designated: 1932
- Reference no.: 140
- Conservation organization: Cultural Heritage, Handicrafts and Tourism Organization of Iran

The Imam Reza shrine (Persian: حرم امام رضا, romanized: Haram-e Emâm Rezâ, lit. 'Sanctuary of Imam Reza') is the mausoleum of Ali al-Rida, the eighth Imam in Shia Islam, located in Mashhad, the province of Razavi Khorasan, Iran. As one of the holiest sites in Shia Islam, with nearly 30 million Muslims making pilgrimages to the shrine every year, it is the most visited pilgrimage site in Islam. Imam Reza was a descendant of the Islamic prophet Muhammad. His lineage traces back to Ali via Muhammad’s daughter Fatima, through the line of Husayn. He is part of the chain of mystical authority in Sunni Sufism, making him widely respected in Sunni Islam as well. He is also regarded as a model of asceticism in Sufism. Uyoun Akhbar Al-Ridha have recorded miracles which have occurred at the shrine.

The shrine covers an area of 1,200,000 square meters, making it the third largest mosque in the world, after Masjid al-Haram in Mecca and the Prophet's Mosque in Medina. The Goharshad Mosque, the Astan Quds Razavi Central Museum, The Central Library of Astan Quds Razavi, and the Razavi University of Islamic Sciences, are also contained within the complex. The complex was added to Iran's National Heritage List on 6 January 1932, and on 2 February 2017, it was added to Iran's tentative list of UNESCO World Heritage Sites. Also buried within the shrine are members of the Timurid, Safavid and Qajar dynasties, alongside the Abbasid caliph Harun al-Rashid, polymath Sheikh Bahāʾī, Crown Prince Abbas Mirza, Supreme Leader Ali Khamenei, and many other notable political figures, scholars, and clerics. The city of Mashhad has been named the Cultural Capital of the Islamic world by the Organisation of Islamic Cooperation.

== Religious significance ==
Several hadiths from the Shia Imams and Muhammad highlight the importance of pilgrimage to the shrine. A hadith from Muhammad says:

One of my own flesh and blood will be buried in the land of Khorasan. God the Highest will surely remove the sorrows of any sorrowful person who goes on pilgrimage to his shrine. God will surely forgive the sins of any sinful person who goes on pilgrimage to his shrine.

The Imam Reza Shrine has been regarded as a very important place of pilgrimage and a major spiritual center for both Shia and Sunni Muslims due to the burial of Ali al-Ridha. Since the presence of Imam Reza in the eastern Islamic region had a significant impact in favor of the Alids and against the Abbasids, it also contributed to the spread of Shia teachings in the region. After his death, the propagation of his teachings was entrusted to his narrators and students, and his burial site gradually became a spiritual center for Shias and, shortly afterward, for Sunnis as well. The prosperity of the burial site of Imam Reza is notable, despite the fact that he is buried next to the Abbasid caliph, Harun al-Rashid. Visitors ranging from common people to many Shia and Sunni kings made pilgrimages to the shrine throughout history.

=== Pilgrimages by Shia monarchs ===
Among the Shia monarchs who visited the shrine is Ismail I, who visited the shrine right after establishing the Safavid Empire. Quli Qutb Shah, the founder of Qutb Shahi dynasty, also visted the shrine. Before launching his major campaign to drive out the Uzbek occupiers from Khorasan, Tahmasp I visited the shrine to pray for victory. According to Safavid chronicles, the shrine's custodian later reported a dream in which Imam Reza assured him that the Shah would be victorious. After successfully driving the Uzbeks out, Tahmasp's devotion to the shrine deepened, and he continued to patronize and embellish it. Suleiman I visited multiple times and sponsored major renovations and donations. Abbas the Great is one of the most famous royal pilgrims. He walked on foot from Isfahan to Mashhad on pilgrimage and greatly expanded the shrine complex. He commissioned the circumferential inscription that encircles the dome today. Nader Shah visited the shrine and endowed it with gifts, including the famous jeweled Negin-Neshan zarih, and the current Saqakhaneh. He also ordered the gilding of the shrine’s minarets, replacing the earlier green tile decoration with gold. The Tomb of Nader Shah is very close to the shrine. Karim Khan of the Zand dynasty sponsored repairs and maintenance of several sections of the complex. Agha Mohammad Khan Qajar also visited the shrine and donated gifts. Fath-Ali Shah Qajar visited and commissioned works at the shrine, including the Qajar-era zarih. Mohammad Shah Qajar visited the shrine and continued restoration projects. Naser al-Din Shah Qajar also visited on several occasions and funded restorations. Mozaffar ad-Din Shah Qajar visited the shrine and ordered repairs to its courtyards. The shrine's current Clock Tower was installed during his reign in 1899.

=== Pilgrimages by Sunni monarchs ===
Among the Sunni monarchs who visited the shrine is the Seljuk Sultan, Sanjar. His son, who fell seriously ill and was brought to the shrine where prayers were offered for his recovery, is reported to have been healed there. This event strengthened the Seljuk court’s devotion to the shrine. Sultan Sanjar later became one of the shrine’s greatest patrons, sponsoring major architectural works, including the construction of the Seljuk-era dome over the shrine. The Samanid kings were notable patrons of Sunni Islamic scholarship. They maintained and supported the shrine in a big way. Although there are limited architectural remnants from their time, historical accounts suggest that the Samanids contributed to the preservation and development of the shrine. When Sebuktigin devastated Mashhad and stopped the pilgrims from visiting the shrine, the Ghaznavid Sultan Mahmud of Ghazni restarted the expansion and renovation of the shrine, and built many fortifications around the city. The Anushtegin Sultans also made some decoration inside the shrine. Under the famed Seljuk Sultan Alp Arslan, Khorasan experienced a period of prosperity that benefited the shrine and the growing pilgrimage city of Mashhad. The Mongol conqueror Timur, who is known for his military campaigns, is associated with visits to the shrine and patronage of the city. The Timurid Sultan Shah Rukh frequently visited Mashhad. Under his reign and that of his wife Gawhar Shad, the magnificent Goharshad Mosque was built within the shrine. Öljaitü of the Ilkhanid Empire converted to Shia Islam and renovated the shrine on a grand scale. The Timurid ruler Sultan Husayn Bayqara is reported to have visited the shrine. The Mughal emperor Akbar the Great is also reported to have visited the shrine. Among prominent Sunni scholars who have visited the shrine are Ibn Khuzayma, Ibn Hibban, and Al-Hakim al-Nishaburi.

=== Visits by non-Muslims and conversion ===
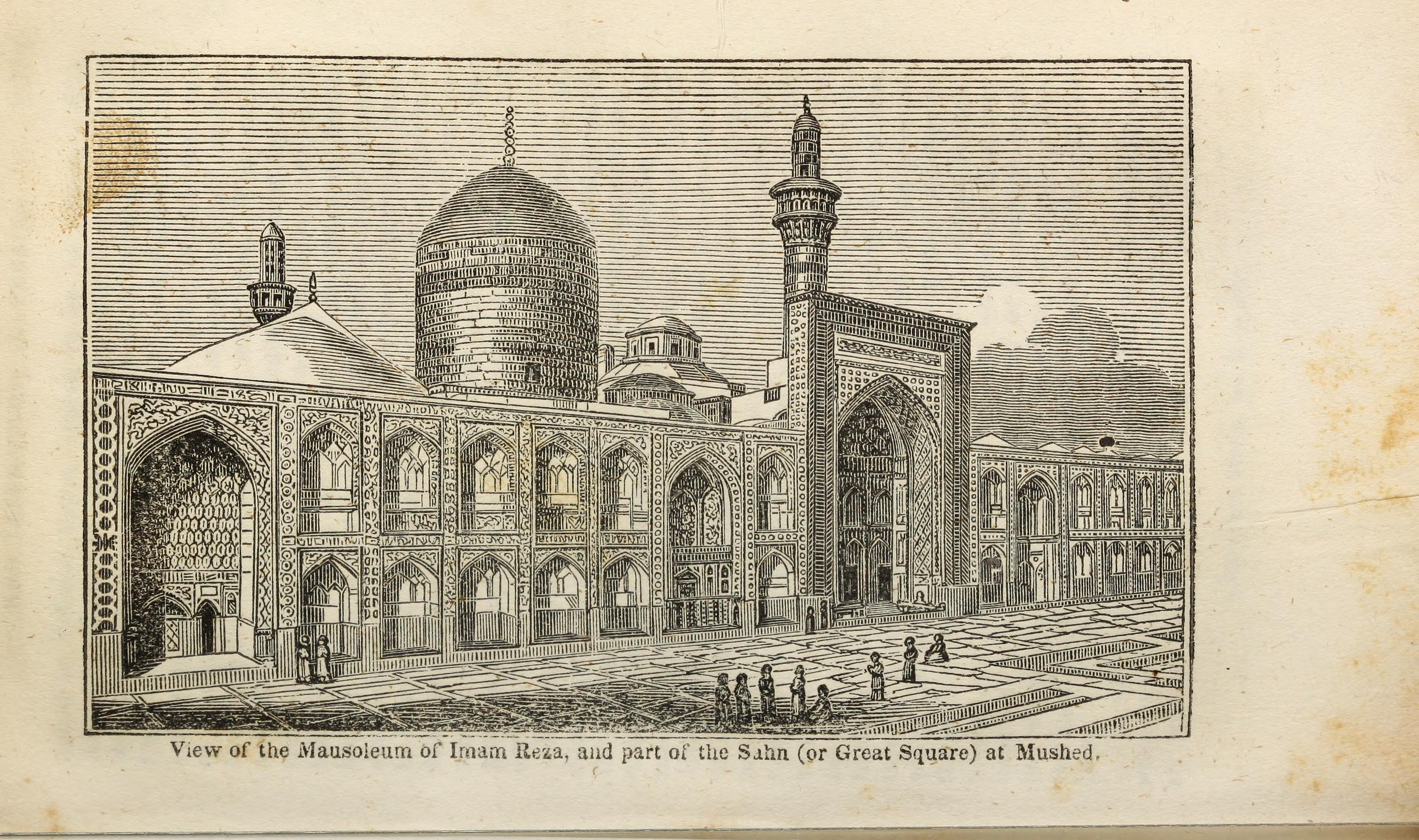
Painting of the shrine by Scottish traveler James Baillie Fraser, 1822. He journeyed to Mashhad and converted to Islam at the shrine.

There are numerous historical and modern reports of non-Muslims and even atheists from across the world visiting the shrine and converting to Islam upon visiting. In recent decades, countless people from China, Korea, Japan Poland, Ireland, Sweden, Norway, Denmark, India Russia, Georgia, Switzerland, France, Argentina, Australia, Greece, United Kingdom, United States, Mexico, Portugal, Ukraine, Canada, Spain, Armenia, Germany, Austria, Belgium, Hungary, the Netherlands and Italy have took their Shahada at the shrine and converted to Islam. Some of them, who had initially come only as tourists or out of curiosity, were deeply affected by the shrine's spiritual atmosphere and converted to Islam.

=== Miracles ===
The Imam Reza Shrine has long been associated with reports of miraculous events (karāmāt) experienced by pilgrims and visitors.ʿUyūn Akhbār al-Riḍā by Ibn Babawayh has preserved accounts related to these events, and later centuries produced a large body of narratives connected specifically to the shrine as a place of healing and spiritual experiences. Many modern accounts describe pilgrims who visited the shrine seeking relief from illnesses and personal hardships and later reported unexpected recoveries or improvements. These accounts have been collected in numerous works about the shrine and are widely published. Another group of narratives concerns non-Muslims who were not previously religiously committed; they entered the shrine out of curiosity, and were deeply affected by its atmosphere and spiritual environment. The shrine is also associated with answered prayers, in which visitors attribute solutions to personal problems, family difficulties, financial struggles, or major life decisions to their prayers at the shrine. For many pilgrims, these experiences reinforce the belief that the shrine is a place of divine blessing (barakah) and spiritual connection.

== History ==
=== Martyrdom of Imam Reza and early years ===
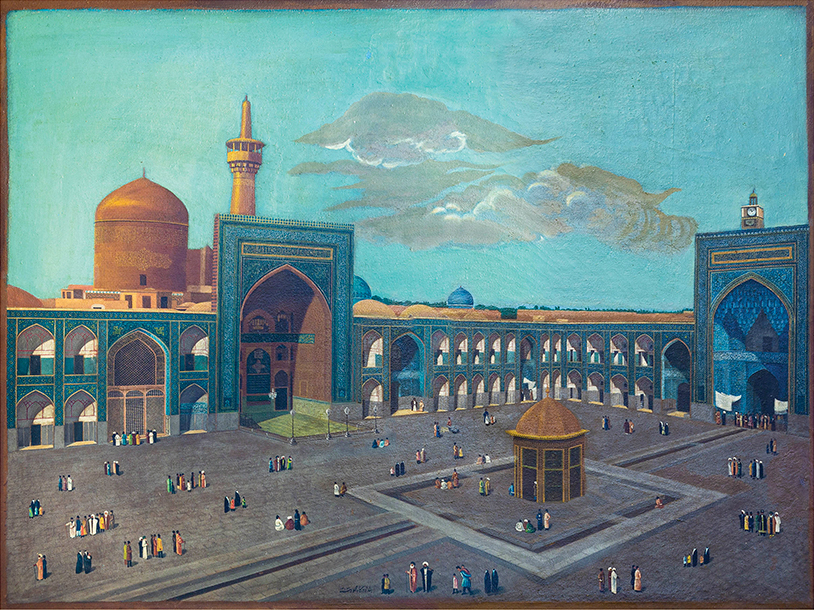
Painting of the shrine during the Qajar era, c. 1886.

The shrine's early history began following the death of Imam Reza in 818 CE. He was poisoned by the Abbasid caliph al-Ma'mun, and was buried beside the grave of al-Ma'mun's father, Harun al-Rashid, in the village of Sanabad, near the city of Tus. The site soon became known as Mashhad al-Reza ("the Place of the Martyrdom of Reza"), from which the city of Mashhad takes its name. Mashhad literally means "The Place Where a Martyr Has Been Buried". During the first century after the Imam's burial, the shrine was relatively modest, consisting primarily of the original mausoleum and a small number of surrounding structures. Pilgrimage gradually increased despite occasional restrictions under some Abbasid rulers. By the 10th century, the Samanid dynasty and later the Ghaznavid dynasty sponsored repairs and improvements, helping establish the site as one of the most important pilgrimage destinations in the Islamic world.

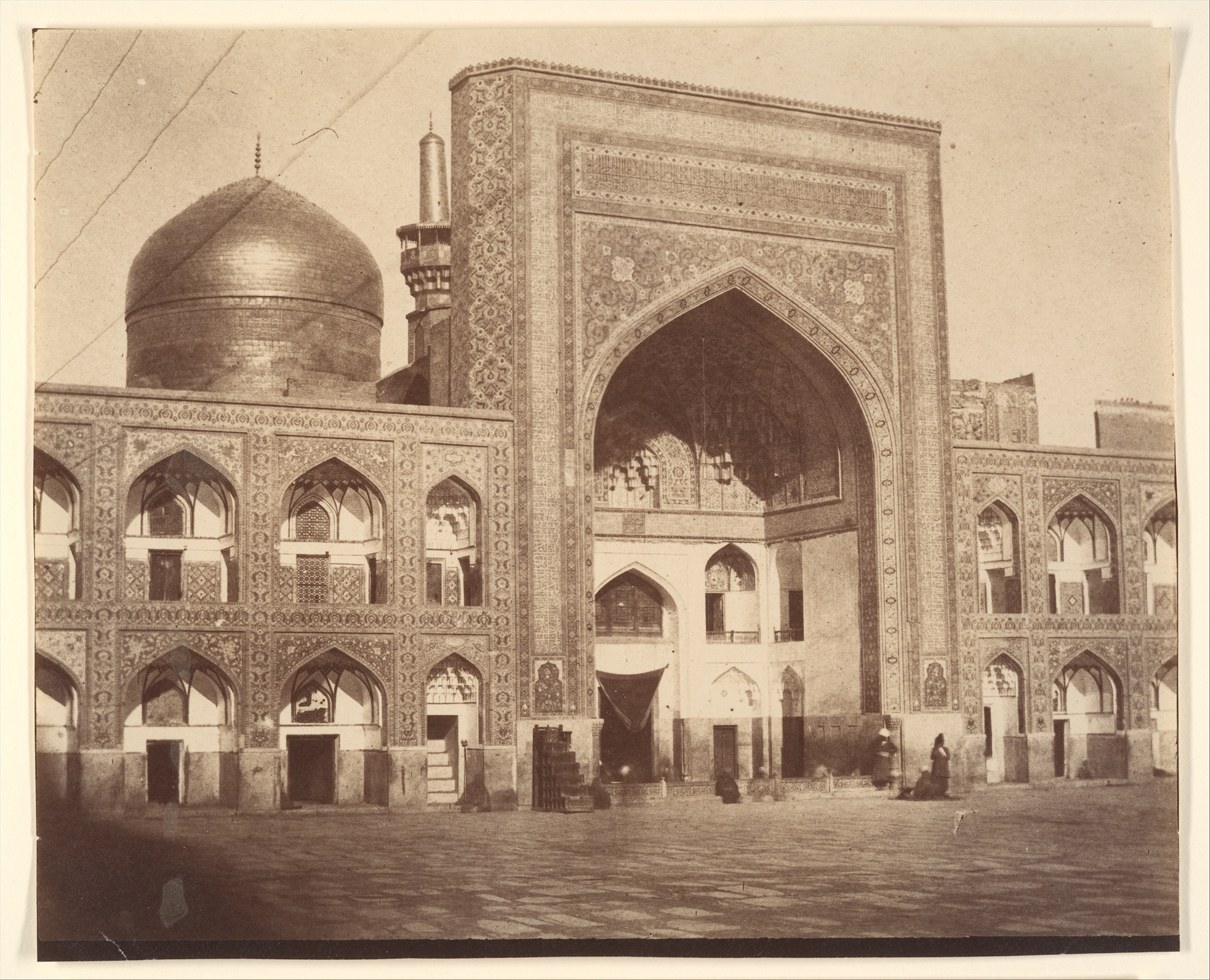
Photo of the shrine by Italian photographer Luigi Pesce, 1851.

Shias and Sunnis (for example, Ibn Hibban wrote in his Kitab al Siqqat that whenever troubled and in Mashad he would always visit the shrine to ask for relief from problems that bothered him) began visiting his grave on pilgrimage. By the end of the 9th century, a dome was built on the grave and many buildings and bazaars sprang up around it. For the next thousand years, it has been devastated and reconstructed several times. The celebrated Muslim traveler Ibn Battuta visited Mashhad and reported that it was a large town with abundant fruit trees, streams and mills. A great dome of elegant construction surmounts the noble mausoleum, the walls being decorated with colored tiles. Opposite the tomb of the Imam is the tomb of caliph Harun al-Rashid, which is surmounted by a platform bearing chandeliers.

=== Samanid and Ghaznavid eras ===
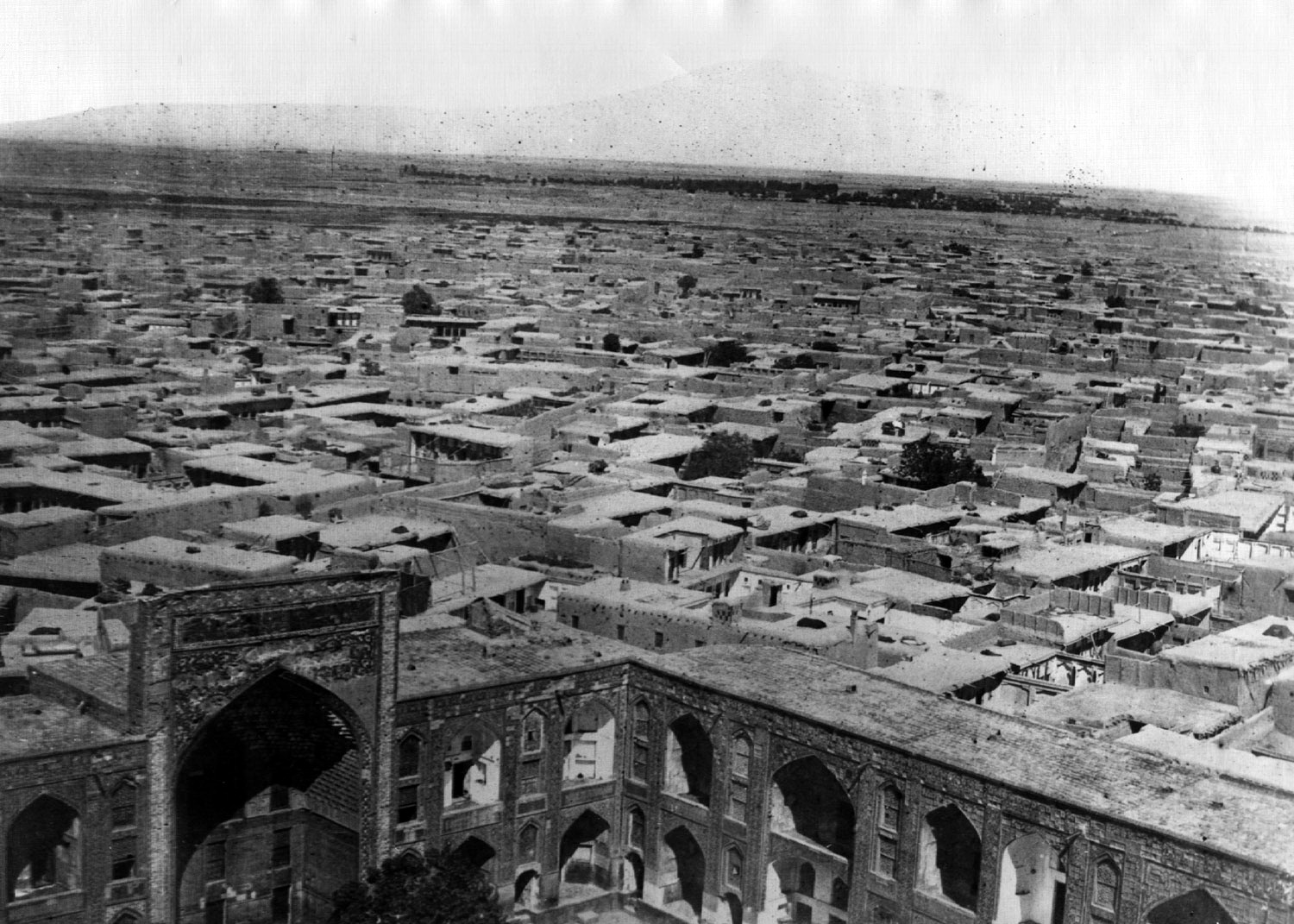
View of Mashhad city from the shrine in 1858.

The Samanids (819–999 CE), who ruled over a large part of Greater Khorasan, were notable patrons of Sunni Islamic scholarship. They maintained and supported the Imam Reza shrine. Although there are limited architectural remnants from their time, historical accounts suggest that the Samanids contributed to the preservation and development of the shrine, ensuring that it remained a focal point for pilgrims. Their support laid the groundwork for later dynasties to expand the shrine.

By the end of the 3rd century AH, a dome was built on the grave of Imam Reza and many buildings and bazaars sprang around the shrine. In 383 AH (993/994 CE), Sebuktigin, the Ghaznavid sultan devastated Mashhad and stopped the pilgrims from visiting the shrine. But in 400 AH (1009/1010 CE), Mahmud of Ghazni restarted the expansion and renovation of the shrine and built many fortifications around the city.

=== Seljuk and Mongols eras ===
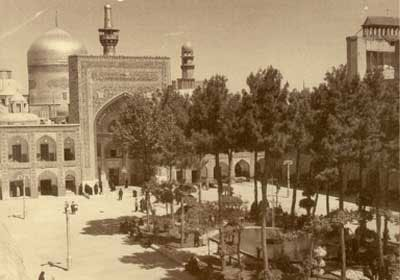
The complex's main garden in 1910.

Sultan Sanjar, after the reported healing of his son in the shrine, renovated the sanctuary and added new buildings within its precincts. At the time of Sultan Sanjar, after Sharaf al-Din Abu Tahir b. Sa'd b. Ali Qummi repaired the shrine, he began to construct a dome over it. In 612 AH (1215/1216 CE), as borne out by inscriptions on certain tiles, Allaudin Khwarezm Shah carried out renovations on the shrine.

During the Khwarazmian dynasty, some repair and decoration was made inside the shrine. In 612 AH (1215/1216 CE) two very glorious embossed Thuluth inscriptions in form of square tile work were fixed on both sides of the shrine entrance-by the side of Dar al-Huffaz porch, in which the names and descent of Imam Reza back to the Prophet were written. The complex includes some other inscriptions and three mihrabs of this era. During the Mongol invasion in 617 AH (1220/1221 CE), Khorasan was plundered by the invading hordes and the survivors of this massacre took refuge in Mashhad and settled around the shrine. Sultan Muhammad Khudabandeh Öljaitü, the Mongol ruler of Iran, converted to Shia Islam and ruled Iran from 703 AH (1303/1304 CE) until 716 AH (1316/1317 CE). Under his rule, the shrine was once again renovated on a grand scale.

=== Timurid and Safavid eras ===
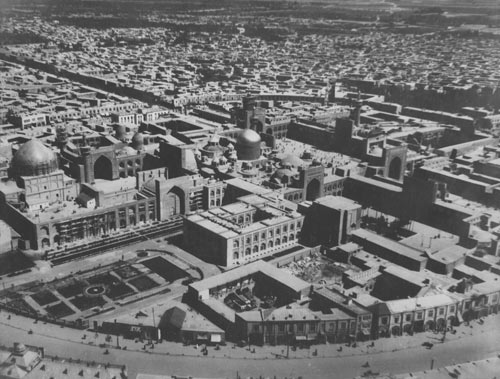
The shrine in 1951, before modern development.

Mashhad's glorious phase started during the reign of Shahrukh, son of Timur, and reached its zenith during the reign of the Safavid kings, who ruled Iran from 1501 to 1736 CE. Shahrukh Mirza, whose capital was Herat, regularly visited Mashhad for the pilgrimage. In the 15th century, during the reign of the Shahrukh Mirza, Mashhad became one of the main cities of the realm. In 1418 CE, his wife, Empress Goharshad, funded the construction of an outstanding mosque beside the shrine, which is known as the Goharshad Mosque.

With the emergence of the Safavid Empire in 1501 CE and their declaration of the Twelver Shia Islam as the state religion, Mashhad reached the peak of its development. However, since Khorasan was a border province of the Safavid Empire, Mashhad suffered repeated invasions and periods of occupation by the Uzbek Khans. Before launching his major campaign to drive out the Uzbek occupiers from Khorasan, Tahmasp I visited the shrine to pray for victory. According to Safavid chronicles, the shrine's custodian later reported a dream in which Imam Reza assured him that the Shah would be victorious. After successfully driving the Uzbeks out, Tahmasp's devotion to the shrine deepened, and he continued to patronize and embellish it. It was during the reign of Abbas the Great, who finally drove out the Uzbeks entrirely from Khorasan. The Atiq Courtyard (Enghelab) was extended in the time of Abbas the Great, and during this era, efforts were made for its further improvement. During the Safavid era, the shrine also received patronage from rulers of the Indian subcontinent, namely Quli Qutb-ul-Mulk (founder of the Qutb Shahi dynasty) and Mughal Emperor Akbar the Great. The latter was notably a Sunni.

=== Afsharid, Zand, and Qajar eras ===
During the Afsharid era (1736–1796), the shrine received significant royal patronage, particularly under Nader Shah Afshar (r. 1736–1747). Nader regarded Mashhad as one of the principal cities of his empire and funded major restoration and embellishment projects at the shrine. The famous Naderi Saqqakhaneh was built during his reign, with its large marble water basin brought from Herat in 1740 CE (1153 AH). He also ordered the gilding of the shrine's main iwan and donated valuable chandeliers, carpets, and manuscripts. After his assassination in 1747, however, further large-scale development was limited. During the Zand era (1751–1794), although the Zand capital was Shiraz, the shrine continued to receive attention. Karim Khan Zand (r. 1751–1779) sponsored repairs and maintenance of several sections of the complex.

The Qajar era (1796–1925) marked another period of substantial expansion and beautification. Successive Qajar shahs donated lavish gifts to the shrine and sponsored numerous restoration projects. Large sections of the complex were renovated, additional gilding was applied to domes and iwans, and new decorative tilework, mirrorwork, and inscriptions were installed. Several new courtyards, madrasas, and service buildings were added or rebuilt, significantly enlarging the shrine complex. During this period, Mashhad also grew into one of the most important pilgrimage cities in the Muslim world.

==== Russian attack ====
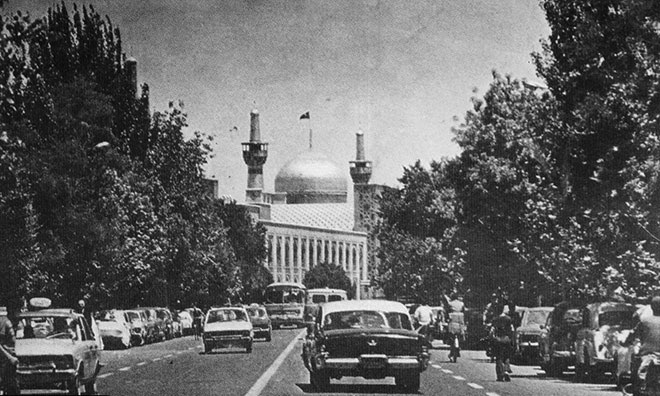
A view of the shrine in 1956.

The Russian bombardment of Mashhad took place in April 1912 during the aftermath of the Persian Constitutional Revolution (1905–1911). The attack was part of wider Russian intervention in Iranian affairs during the late Qajar era, as Russia sought to maintain its political influence in the country. At the time, Mashhad was experiencing political unrest, and some opponents of the constitutional government and supporters of the former Qajar ruler Mohammad Ali Shah took refuge inside the shrine, using the traditional sanctuary protection of the holy site. Russian forces surrounded the shrine and demanded the surrender of those inside. After the refusal, Russian artillery bombarded the complex.

=== Modern era ===
The Imam Reza Shrine entered the modern era in the early 20th century, when new facilities and infrastructure were introduced to accommodate the rapidly growing number of pilgrims. Following the Iranian Revolution, the complex underwent its largest expansion in history, with the construction of vast new courtyards, prayer halls, libraries, museums, and service facilities. Despite these additions, the historic sanctuary and its architectural heritage have remained at the heart of the shrine, which today stands as one of the largest religious complexes in the world.

==== Goharshad Mosque rebellion ====
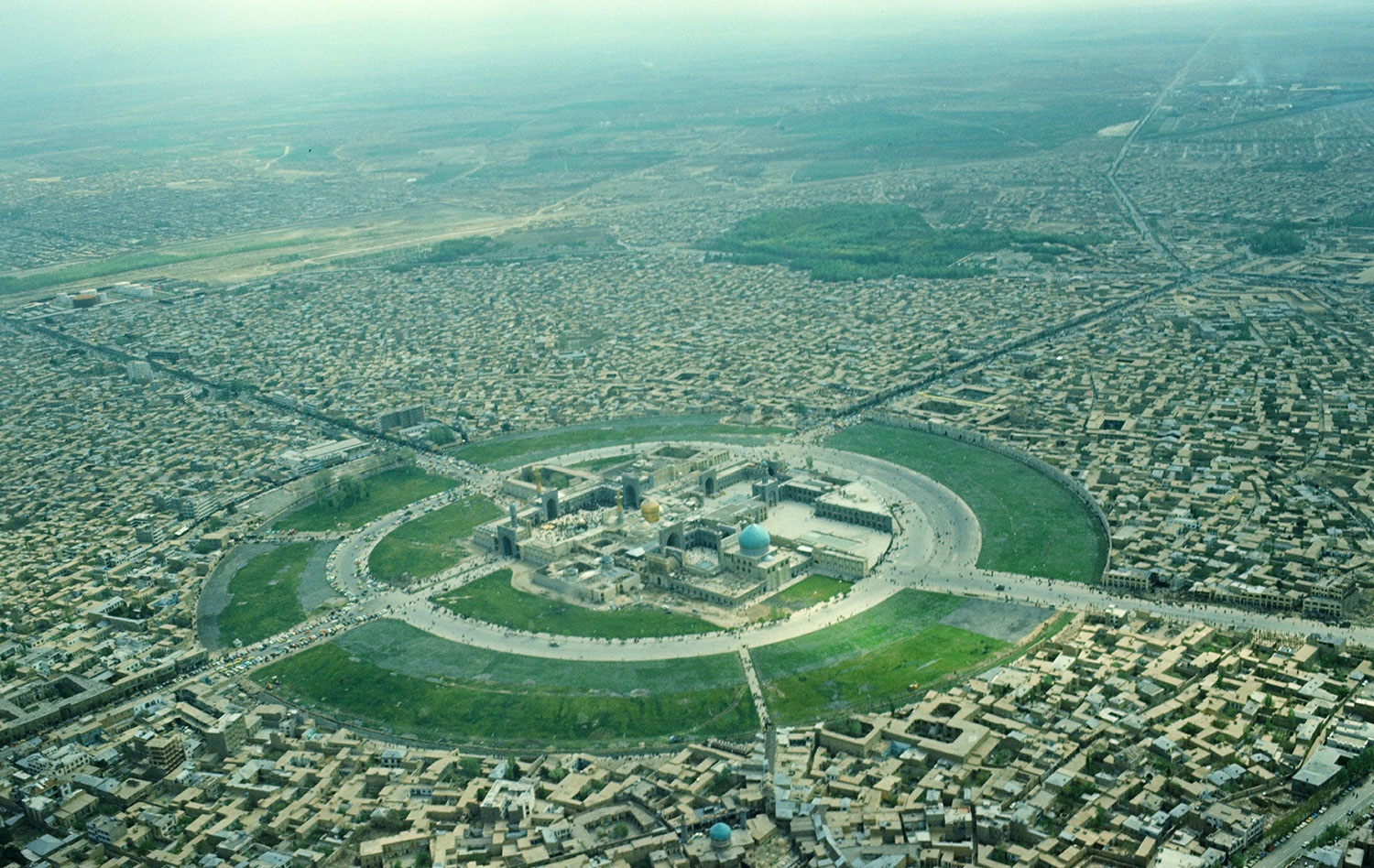
Aerial view of the shrine in 1976

On 13 July 1935, armed forces of Reza Shah, the reigning monarch of Iran and founder of Pahlavi dynasty, invaded the shrine and massacred people inside the Goharshad Mosque. The people there were protesting against the westernizing and secularist policies of Reza Shah which many considered to be anti-Islamic. The Shah's violent Westernization campaign against the Muslim society saw a spike in hostilities with the regime in the summer of 1935, when Reza Shah banned the Islamic clothing and ordered all men to be forced to wear European-style bowler hats.

The exact number of people killed remains disputed among historians. Some contemporary foreign reports estimated that around 128 people were killed, with several hundred wounded and many arrested. However, later Iranian accounts have claimed much higher figures, ranging from 2,000 to 5,000 deaths, although these numbers are debated. Most historians agree that hundreds of people were killed. On 21 November 1978 during the Iranian Revolution, troops under orders from the regime of Mohammad Reza Pahlavi, Reza Shah's son and successor, killed 2 people inside the shrine.

==== 1994 explosion ====
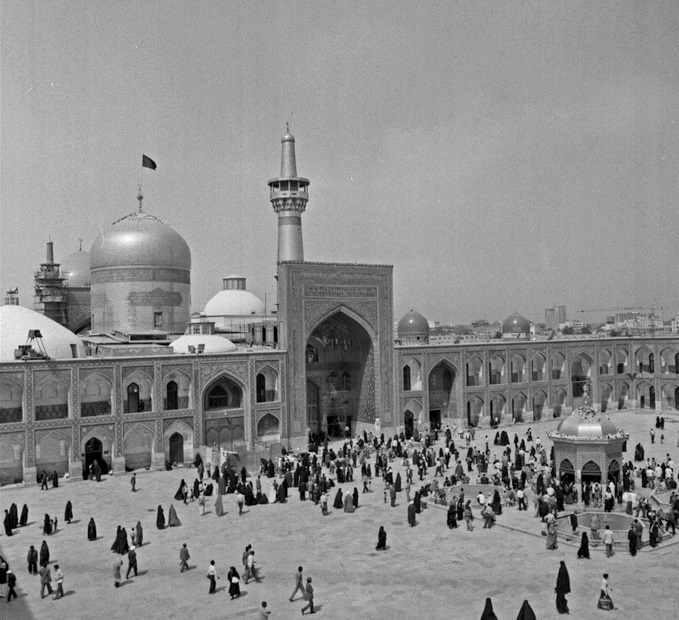
The shrine in 1984.

On 20 June 1994, a bomb explosion occurred at the shrine. To maximize the number of casualties, the explosion took place on Ashura, one of the holiest days in Shia Islam, when countless of pilgrims had gathered to commemorate the death of the third Imam and Muhammad's grandson, Husayn. The attack left at least 25 dead and 70 injured. (Note: Other estimates range from 200 to nearly 300.) The bomb was equivalent to 4.5 kilograms (10 lb) of TNT. Although a radical Sunni militant group claimed responsibility, the Iranian government laid the blame on the People's Mujahedin of Iran, and others accused a Pakistani militant.

===== 2022 stabbings =====
On 5 April 2022, a stabbing took place at the shrine, killing two clerics and wounding a third. The perpetrator, identified as foreign national Abdullatif Moradi, was immediately arrested along with six others accused of assisting him. The attacker was an Afghan national of Uzbek ethnicity who had entered Iran illegally through the Pakistan border about a year before the attack. He was identified as an adherent of Takfiri extremist ideology with anti-Shia views.

==== Funeral of Ali Khamenei ====
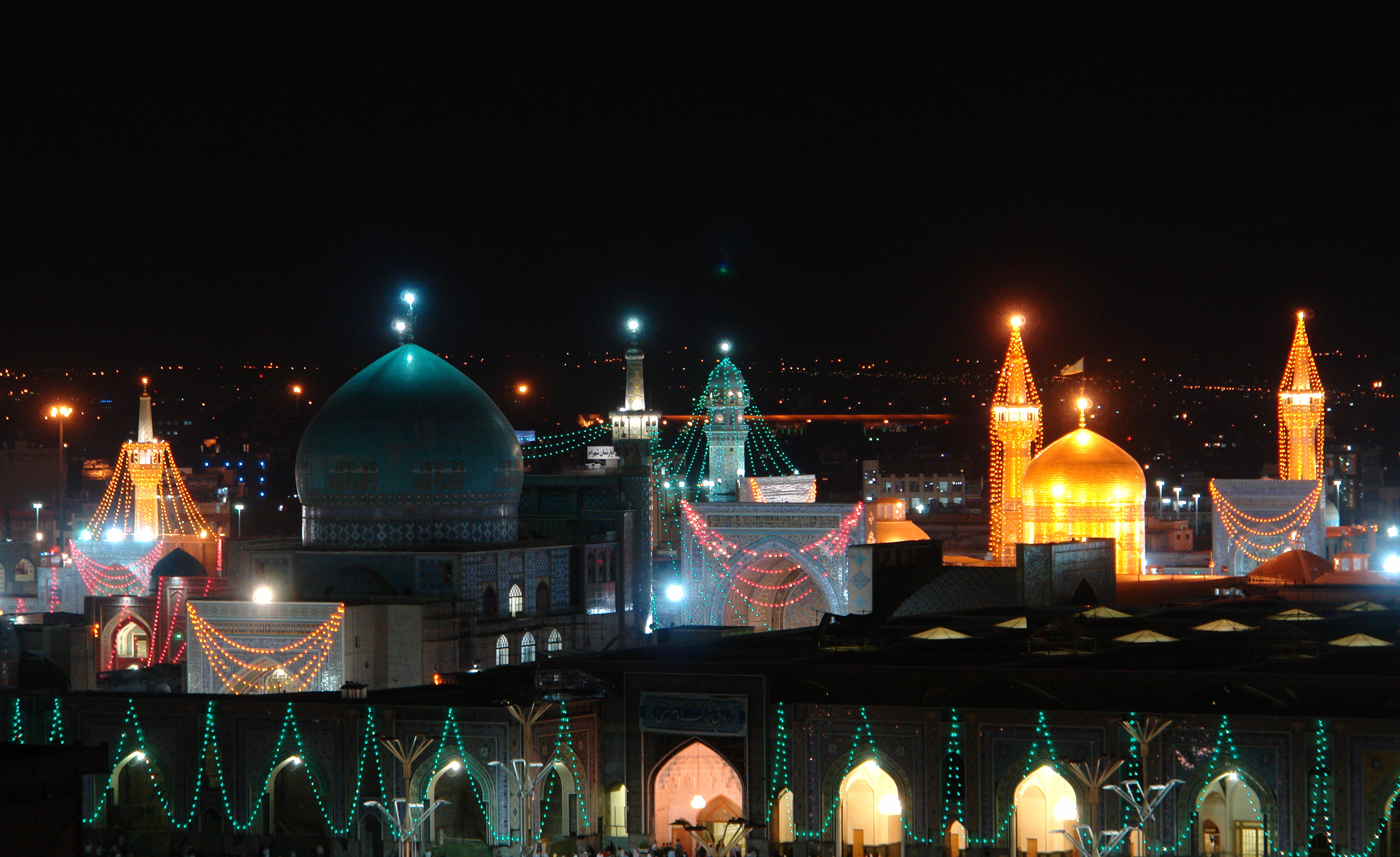
The shrine at night, 2007.

After the Assassination of Supreme Leader Ali Khamenei and his funeral, he was buried in the Imam Reza Shrine on July 9, 2026. Mashhad was his birthplace, and he was buried after six days of funeral ceremonies across holy cities in Iran and Iraq. Several ceremonies were held at Imam Ali Shrine in Najaf, Imam Husayn Shrine in Karbala, and Jamkaran Mosque in Qom, before his burial at the Imam Reza Shrine in Mashhad. Due to overcrowding in Mashhad, the coffin was transferred by helicopter to the Imam Reza Shrine. He was buried at the Dar al-Zikr Riwaq within the shrine.

== Specifications ==
=== Minarets ===
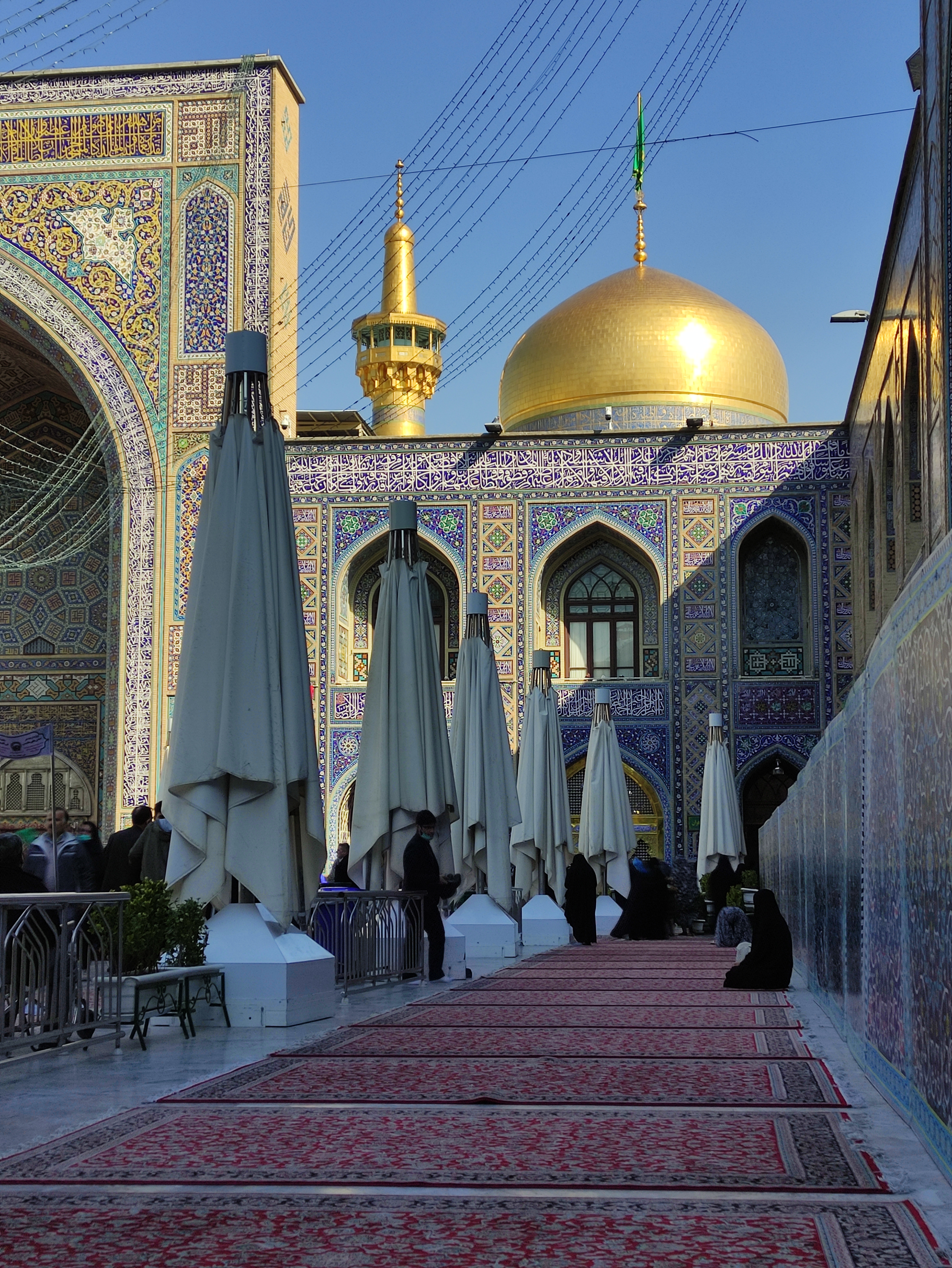
View of the dome and minaret from the Goharshad Courtyard.

The shrine began as a modest mausoleum built after the death of Imam Reza. Over more than twelve centuries, successive dynasties, including the Abbasids, Seljuks, Timurids, Safavids, Afsharids, Qajars, and the modern Iranian state, expanded it into the monumental complex that is today, and it is still expanding. At the heart of the complex stands the sacred burial chamber beneath the shrine's iconic golden dome, which rises about 31 meters (102 feet) above its base and is covered with thousands of gold plates. The dome has become one of the most recognizable architectural landmarks in Islam. Surrounding it are 14 minarets, ranging in height from roughly 40 to 43 meters, positioned around the various courtyards. Two of these stand beside the golden dome itself, while others frame the entrances and monumental iwans of the larger courtyards.

=== Courtyards ===
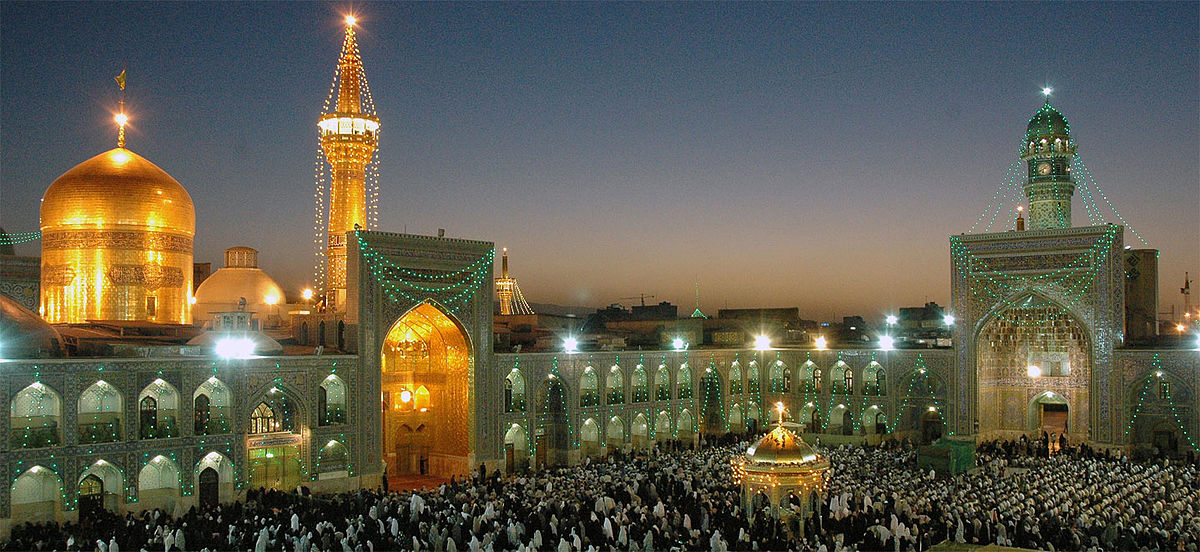
Enghelab Courtyard, the largest in the shrine.

The shrine is organized around seven principal courtyards (sahns). The oldest is Atiq Courtyard (Enghelab), built in 16th century during the Safavid Empire, which serves as the historic heart of the complex and contains the famous Ismail Talaei Saqqakhaneh.

The Azadi courtyard, built in the 17th century, is another historic courtyard dating largely from the Safavid period and is distinguished by the elegant Golden Veranda overlooking the shrine.

The Quds Courtyard provides a quieter space associated with Jerusalem. The Jomhuri Islami Courtyard was created during the 20th century and is recognized by its broad ceremonial space and twin minarets. The Ghadir and Kowsar Courtyards are among the newer courtyards added to handle the growing number of pilgrims.

=== Iwans ===
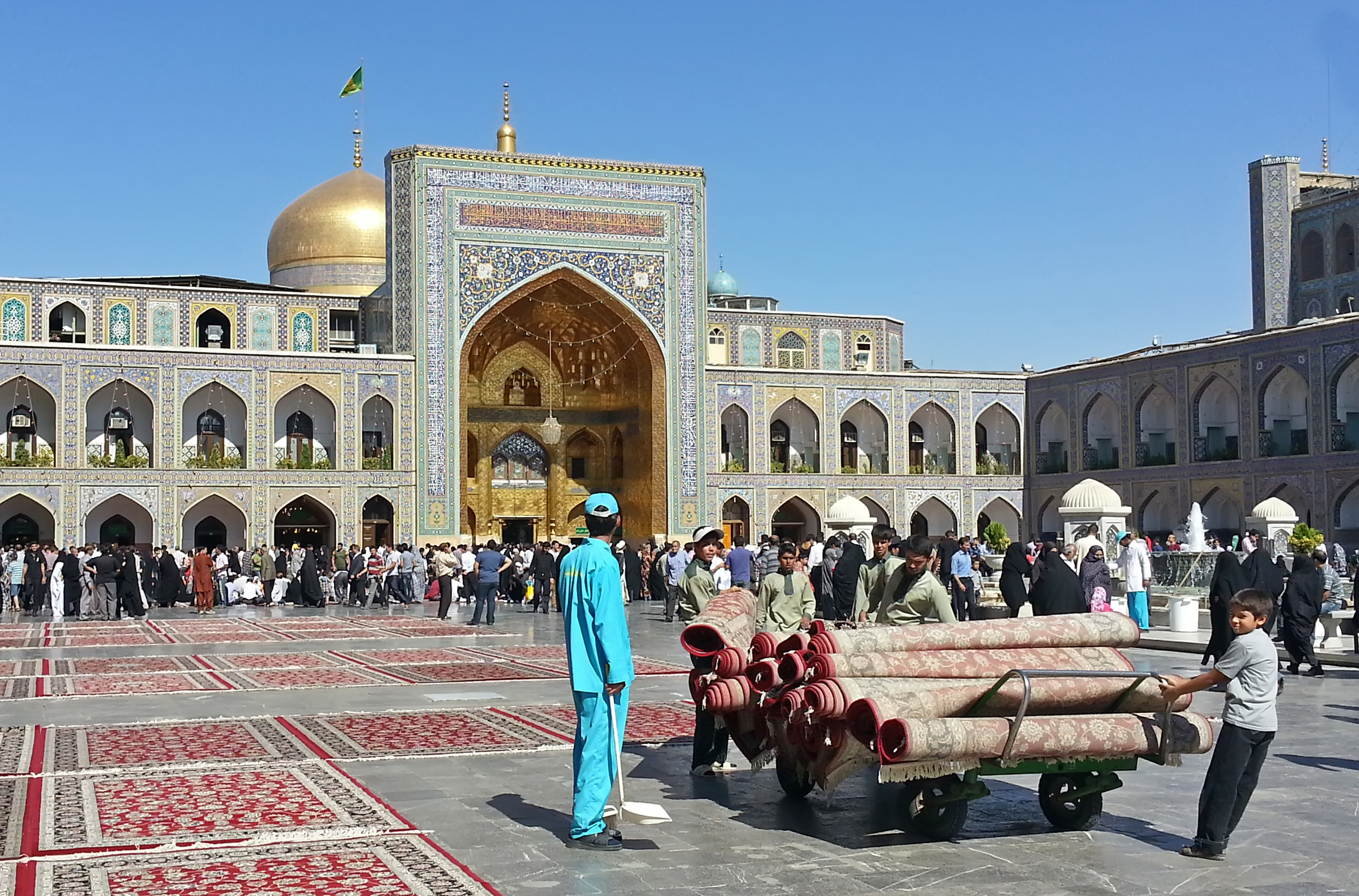
A view of the Naseri Golden Iwan in the Azadi Courtyard, with volunteers placing carpets for the afternoon prayers.

There are four main iwans located on the east, west, north, and south sides of the shrine. The northern iwan of the shrine’s central structure, which corresponds to the southern side of the Enghelab Courtyard, is known as the Naderi Golden Iwan. It is one of the gilded iwans of the complex. It connects to the surrounding areas through four doors leading to different sections of the shrine complex. The southern iwan of the central shrine, which corresponds to the northern side of Goharshad Courtyard, serves as a connection between The Goharshad Courtyard and the Dar al-Siyadah hall. This is known as the Dar al-Siyadah Iwan. Above its entrance is a silver-decorated window bearing the hadith from the Prophet saying “I am the city of knowledge, and Ali is its gate.” The eastern iwan, corresponding to the western side of the Azadi Courtyard, is known as the Naseri Golden Iwan. It was originally built by order of Fath-Ali Shah and later gilded during the reign of Naser al-Din Shah. It connects to surrounding halls through five doors. The western iwan, also known as the Golden Iwan of the Jomhuri Courtyard, was constructed in 1989, and is one of the modern gilded iwans of the shrine. It connects the Jomhuri Courtyard to Dar al-Wilayah through a corridor.

In addition to these four main iwans leading to the sacred precincts, there are several other notable iwans within the complex. The western iwan of the Enghelab Courtyard, known as the Clock Iwan or the Clock Tower, dates back to the reign of Abbas the Great in the Safavid era. The current clock was installed on top of it in 1899 during the reign of Mozaffar ad-Din Shah Qajar, giving it its current name. On the northern side of the Enghelabd Courtyard stands the Abbasi Iwan, built during the Safavid era under Abbas the Great. Later, a golden minaret, known as the Naderi minaret, was added by Nader Shah above it. The eastern side of the Enghelab Courtyard contains the Naqareh-Khaneh Iwan, also dating back to Abbas the Great. Another major structure is the Maqsura Iwan, located on the southern side and associated with the Goharshad Mosque. Its grand arched entrance is richly decorated with tilework, and the dome of Goharshad Mosque is built above it. Finally, the largest and tallest iwan of the entire complex is Vali Asr Iwan (Qibla Iwan), located in the southern section of Jame Razavi Courtyard. It it the most monumental iwan in the complex. The shrine's courtyards, porticos, and iwans are adorned with numerous Quranic verses, poems and hadiths (such as the Hadith of the Golden Chain on the entrance portal of the Great Prophet's Courtyard).

=== Fountains and reflecting pools ===
The shrine's earliest courtyards contained stone pools supplied by qanats and wells, which provided water for pilgrims and for ritual use. As the complex expanded under the Safavids, Afsharids, and Qajars, these pools became larger and more decorative, often occupying the central axis of the courtyards.

Today, nearly every major courtyard contains a large reflecting pool surrounded by fountains. Besides enhancing the beauty of the shrine, they also help cool the surrounding environment during Mashhad's hot summers. They also contribute to the visual harmony of the shrine by reflecting the golden dome and surrounding tilework.

A historic pool dating back to the Ilkhanid Empire (1256–1335 CE) was discovered within the complex in 2025. This discovery is significant because it confirmed that the shrine had developed aesthetic elements such as reflecting pools and fountains centuries before many of its later expansions.

=== Goharshad Mosque ===
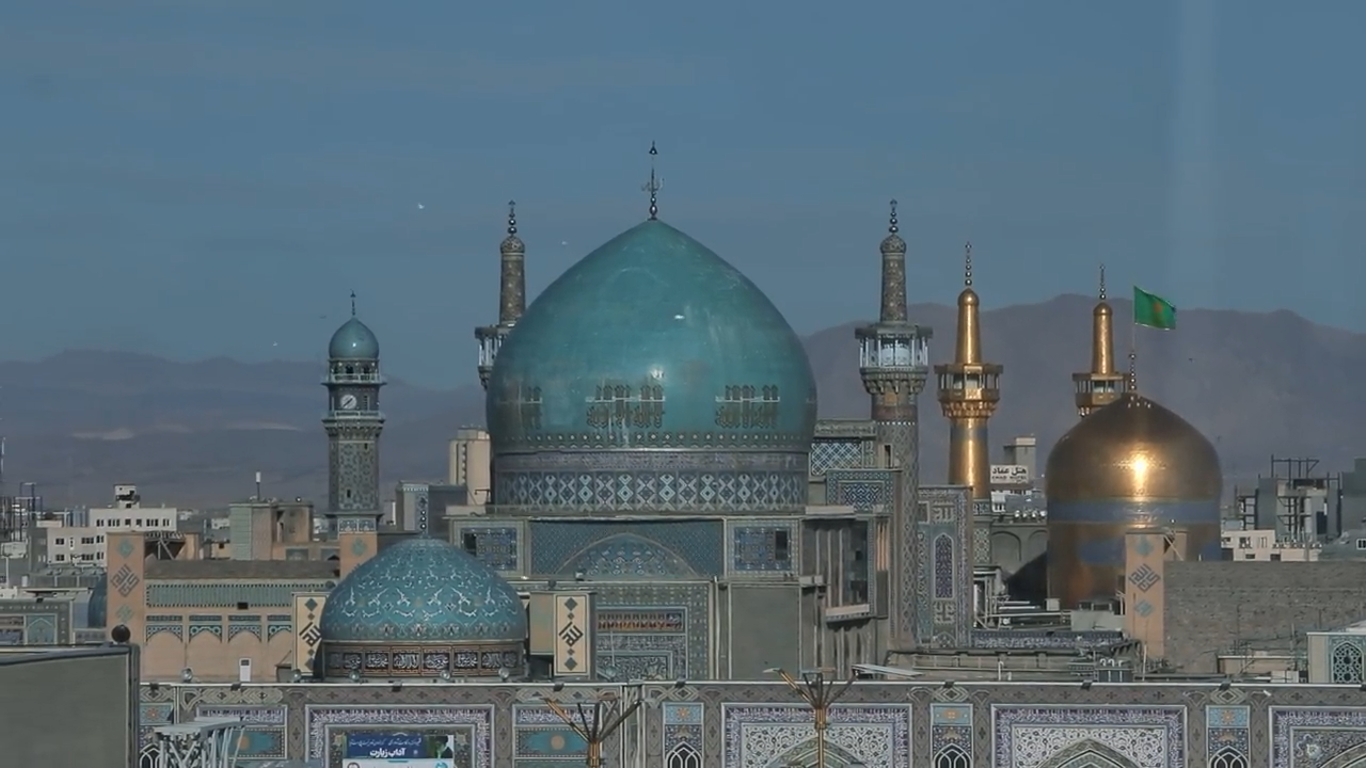
The Goharshad Mosque is connected directly to the shrine, built in 1418 AD by Empress Goharshad during the Timurid Empire.

Connected directly to the shrine is the magnificent Goharshad Mosque, built in 1418 AD by Empress Goharshad during the Timurid Empire. It features a classic four-iwan layout, a large turquoise dome, two soaring minarets, expansive prayer halls, and some of the finest mosaic tilework in Persian Islamic architecture. The complex is entered through four major bast gateways, each serving as a monumental transition from the city into the sacred precinct.

Beyond the religious structures, the shrine also includes one of the Islamic world's largest libraries, containing millions of books and manuscripts, several museums displaying Qurans, carpets, jewelry, coins, ceramics, weapons, and historical manuscripts, as well as seminaries, universities, administrative buildings, hospitals, dining facilities, gardens, and extensive underground prayer spaces.

=== Schools ===
Around the Shrine, historical records mention about 10 religious schools, although today only four of them remain. The oldest known one was the Balasar Madrasa, located on the western edge of the Zanjir Bazaar near the “head side” (balasar) of the shrine. It dates back to the Ghaznavid period (977–1186 CE). It was a two-story structure with 28 rooms and a small courtyard with four iwans, used for housing students and visitors. Over time it was repaired several times during the Safavid and later Qajar periods, but it was eventually demolished during modern shrine expansions, and no trace of it remains today. Another important school is the Peyr-e Zard Madrasa (Pirezad), founded by Pirezad Khanom, a lady-in-waiting of Gowharshad Agha. It was located next to the Goharshad Mosque and opposite the Do Dar Madrasa. It originally had around 20–30 students and was rebuilt during the Safavid era. It was demolished during 20th-century expansions, it was later reconstructed in the 1980s in its original Timurid-style form, with two floors and 22 rooms decorated with fine tilework and plasterwork.

The Paeen Pa Madrasa was built during the Safavid period by Mirza Sa’d al-Din Mohammad in the reign of Shah Suleiman. It was located near the eastern side of Goharshad Mosque, but was demolished in 1931 during development of new shrine courtyards and the museum complex. The Abd al-Khan Madrasa, once located near the tomb of Pir-e Palandouz in Mashhad, also disappeared after modern expansion projects. The Baqeriyeh Madrasa was another Safavid-era school built on the northern side of the Bala Khiyaban area. It covered about 1,200 square meters and was eventually demolished in the 1970s during large-scale redevelopment of the shrine area. In general, these schools were an important part of the shrine’s scholarly environment, but most were gradually removed during modern expansion projects, with only a few reconstructed or preserved to maintain the historical memory of the complex.

The existence of these schools reflects the broader significance of the Imam Reza Shrine as a place connected to the entire Muslim community. It shows that, throughout history, the shrine was not only associated with one particular group, but was also visited by and connected with Sunni Muslims, scholars, and students of Islamic sciences. This historical presence highlights the shrine’s importance as a religious and cultural center within the broader Islamic world.

=== Halls ===
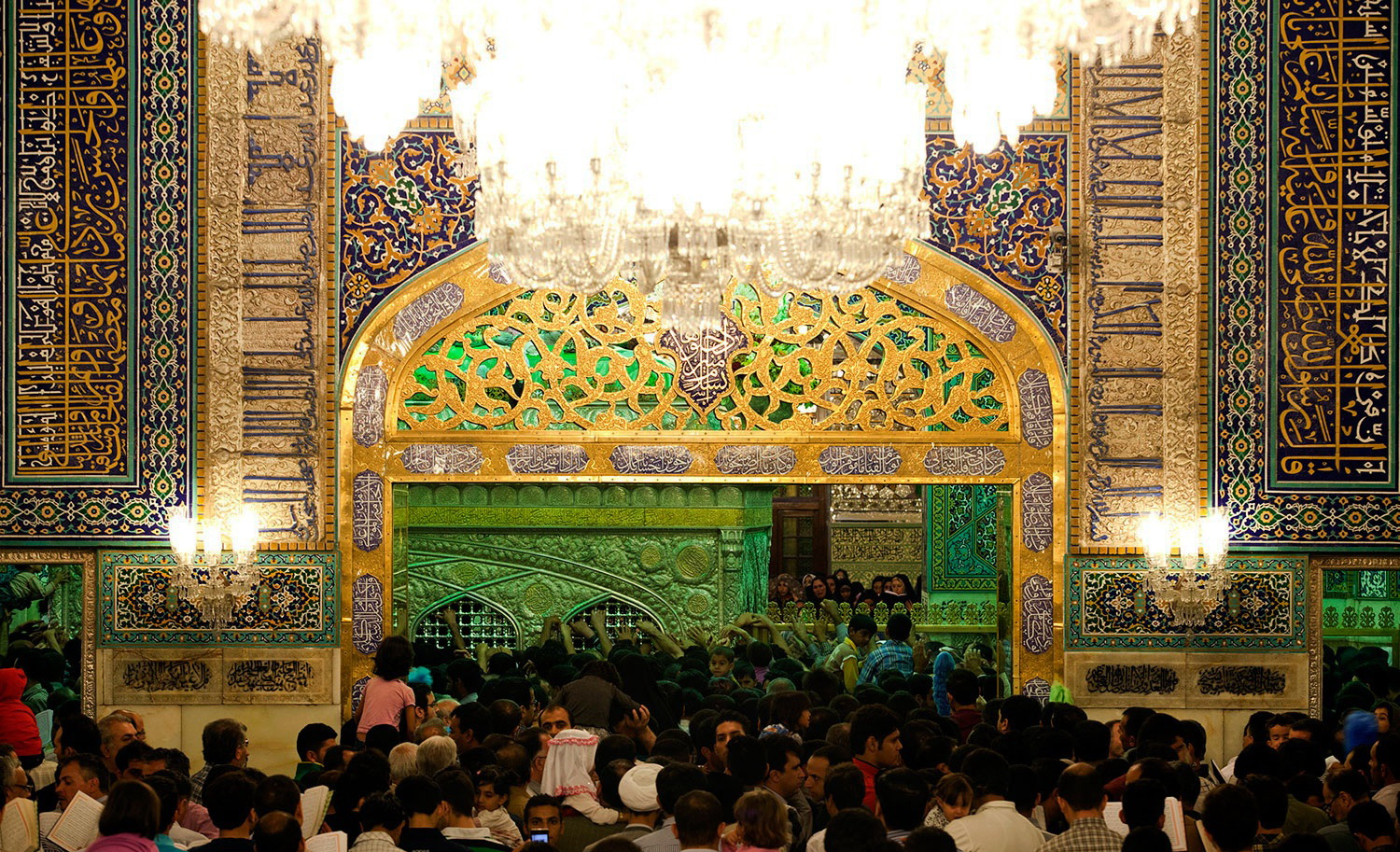
Dar al-Hifaz, one of the shrine's closest sections to the sacred tomb.

The riwaqs (halls) are the enclosed prayer and ceremonial halls that surround the central shrine. They provide indoor spaces for worship, reflection, and access to the sacred tomb. The complex contains 21 riwaqs, with some of the best-known being Dar al-Hifaz, Dar al-Siyadah, Dar al-Shukr, Dar al-Wilayah, Dar al-Rahmah, and Dar al-Hidayah. Each hall is richly decorated with mirror mosaics, marble, Qur'anic calligraphy, and traditional Persian-Islamic ornamentation. The basts are the shrine's monumental entrance precincts that connect the surrounding city to the sacred courtyards. They serve as the main gateways through which pilgrims enter the complex. The four principal basts are Bast Shaykh Toosi, Bast Shaykh Tabarsi, Bast Shaykh Baha'i, and Bast Shaykh Hur Ameli, each named after a prominent Islamic scholar and leading to different sections of the shrine.

=== Naqareh-khaneh ===
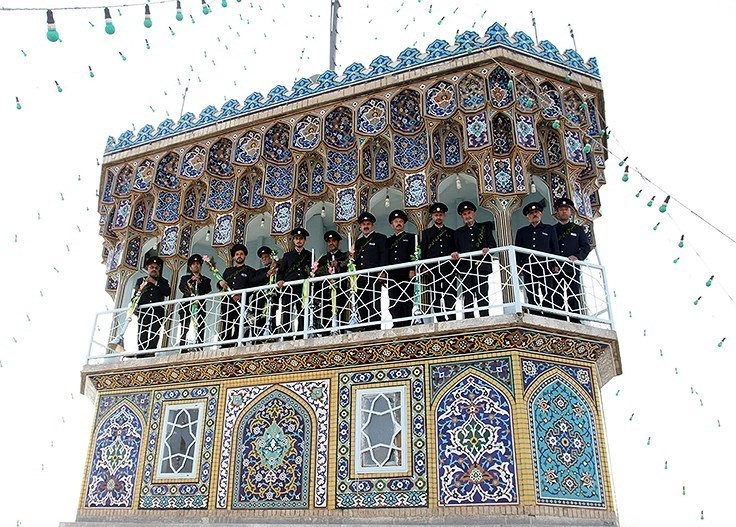
The Naqareh-khaneh is the place where ceremonial drums and trumpets are played daily as part of an ancient ritual known as naqareh-zani. This tradition once existed in various other holy Islamic sites, but today it survives exclusively at the Imam Reza Shrine. Its sound is considered a symbol of the shrine’s grandeur and religious significance. When a miracle or a significant act of divine grace is believed to occur at the shrine, the Naqqareh Khaneh also begins playing its drums and horns as a public announcement.

The Naqareh-khaneh (drum house) is one of the most important traditional parts of the Imam Reza Shrine. It is the place where ceremonial drums and trumpets are played as part of a long-standing ritual known as naqareh-zani. Each performance of this music is called a “nobat” (turn). Historically, kings would order the drums and trumpets to be played during specific times of day and night to announce celebrations and royal occasions. While this tradition once existed in various other holy Islamic shrines, today it survives exclusively at the Imam Reza Shrine. At the shrine, naqareh is played twice daily (at sunrise and sunset) for about 20 minutes. On special religious occasions, such as important commemorative days, it may be played for up to 30 minutes. The sound is considered a symbol of the shrine’s grandeur and religious significance.

In earlier times, the musicians of the Naqareh-khaneh were known as “amaljat-e shokuh” (servants of glory), and today they are called “naqareh-chi”. The position is hereditary, passed from father to son, provided the successor meets the required qualifications. The Naqareh-khaneh is located on the eastern side of the Enghelab Courtyard. Historical records do not clearly identify the exact origin date of this tradition at the shrine. However, the earliest known reference appears to come from the 15th century, which describes the practice as established and active. Later Safavid-era sources mention an organized system for managing the Naqareh-khaneh, while during the Qajar period it was also referred to as the “Karna-khaneh” (trumpet house). Today, even special events such as the recovery of ill patients at the shrine may be marked by the sound of the naqareh, continuing this centuries-old tradition. According to the tradition, when a miracle or a significant act of divine grace is believed to occur at the shrine, the Naqqareh Khaneh also begins playing its drums and horns as a public announcement.

=== Saqakhaneh ===
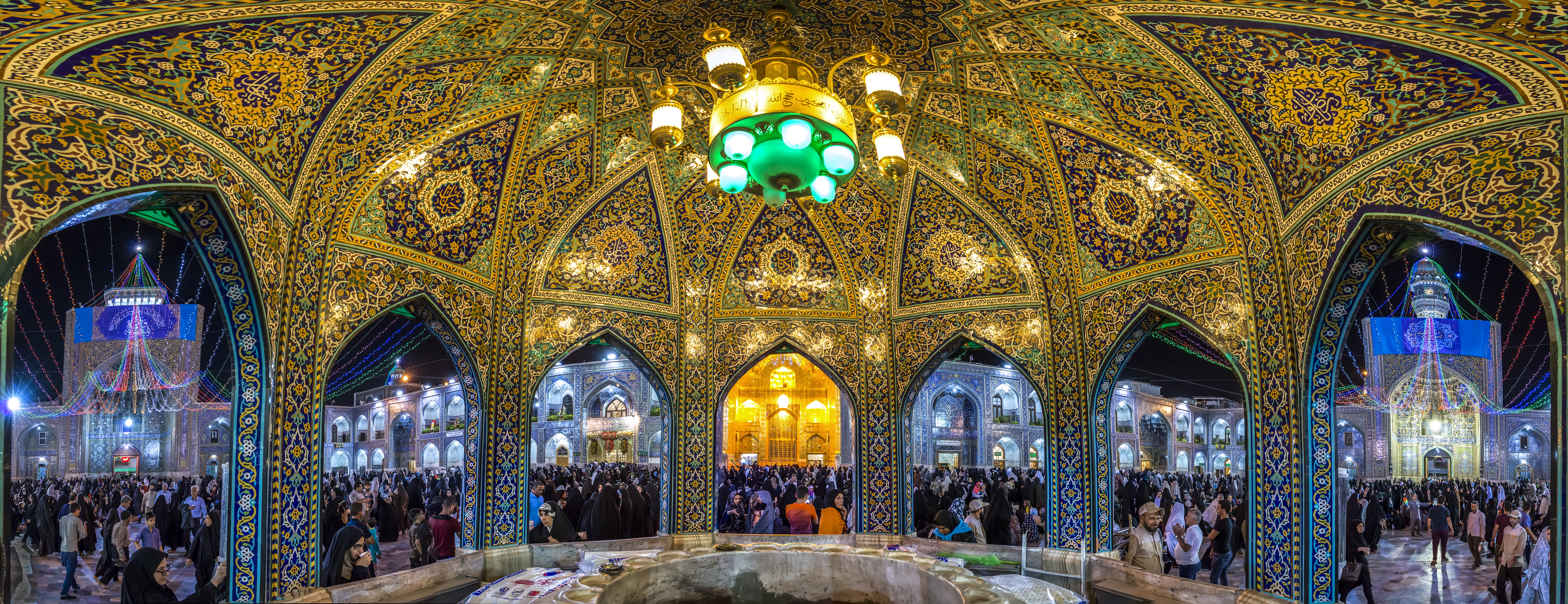
Inside the Ismail Talaei Saqakhaneh, where pilgrims take blessed water.

There are three saqakhanehs in the complex. The most famous one is the Ismail Talaei, located in the center of Enghelab Courtyard. It is historically known as the Naderi Saqakhaneh. It is one of the most important parts of the shrine and has long served as a place where pilgrims take blessed water. This saqqakhaneh has a long history dating back centuries. The current structure was built during the reign of Nader Shah. Its current water basin, made of pure marble, was brought from Herat by Nader Shah himself in 1732. The basin remains in its original place inside the Saqqakhaneh and continues to provide blessed water to pilgrims today.

The second saqqakhaneh is located in the Quds Courtyard, and was inaugurated together with the courtyard in 1990. Unlike the historic Saqqakhaneh, its water is supplied through a modern electronic distribution system. It's designed as a architectural representation of the Dome of the Rock at Al-Aqsa in Jerusalem, with a gilded dome and exterior tilework inspired by the original. The third saqqakhaneh, located in the Jomhuri Islami Courtyard, is a modern water pavilion of the shrine constructed as part of the courtyard's development in the late 20th century. It is built with marble and decorated with traditional Islamic motifs.

=== Dome ===
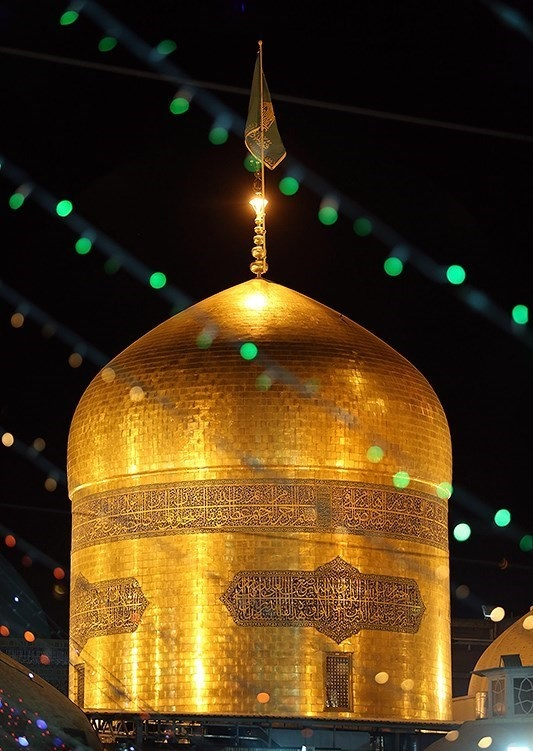
The circumferential inscription on the shrine's iconic dome was commissioned by Safavid king Abbas the Great, written in elegant Thuluth script on a lapis-blue background. The inscription commemorates Abbas the Great's famous pilgrimage on foot from Isfahan to Mashhad and records that he ordered the dome to be gilded using his own wealth.

The dome of the shrine is a double-layered structure. In the late 15th century, the outer shell was constructed over it, which is the present golden dome. The height of the dome is approximately 19 meters to the base of the central point and about 31 meters to the top of the dome’s neck. The shrine dome consists of two main layers above the tomb chamber. The first layer is the inner dome of the shrine (gonbad-khāneh), formed with vaulted and muqarnas-style architecture, known as the qobbeh. The second layer sits above it and is what is commonly referred to as the dome itself. Originally, it was built with yellow Iranian bricks and later decorated with tiles.

During the reign of Tahmasp I of the Safavid Empire, the dome was gilded for the first time without altering its structure. The tiles were removed and the surface was covered with copper sheets plated with gold. At the same time, the nearby minaret was also gilded. During the Seljuk period, Sharf al-Din Abu Taher Qomi, the vizier of Sultan Sanjar, made major restorations to the shrine, including tilework and the construction of a dome over the structure. This dome has remained in place for nearly 900 years. Inscriptions around the dome mention its builders, identifying Kamal al-Din Yazdi as the tile artisan and Reza Abbasi as the calligrapher of the circular inscriptions.

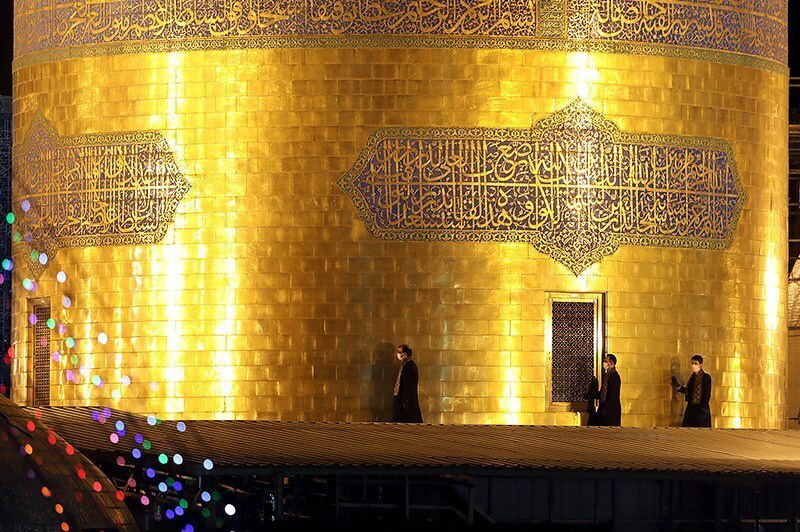
The four medallion-shaped inscriptions, known collectively as the Four Cartouches, were added after the dome was repaired by Safavid king Suleiman I following the devastating earthquake during his reign.

During the Uzbek invasion of Khorasan in 1578, Abd al-Mu’min Khan plundered the shrine and stole the gold covering of the dome and minaret. After this event, Abbas the Great made pilgrimage on foot from Isfahan to Mashhad and ordered the re-gilding of the dome. After some years, a severe earthquake caused cracks in the outer dome and led to the loss of some gold tiles. Shah Suleiman ordered its repair and re-gilding. The details of this restoration were recorded in four decorative panels around the dome by the calligrapher Mohammad Reza Emami. Then the dome was damaged by Russian artillery fire, and bullet marks are still visible inside the structure today. Later, the governor of Khorasan, Nayer al-Dawla, carried out repairs.

Several important inscriptions decorate the golden dome, commemorating major restorations carried out by the Safavid kings. The most prominent is the circumferential inscription that encircles the base of the dome. Commissioned by Abbas the Great after his restoration of the shrine, it is written in elegant Thuluth script on a lapis-blue background in Arabic. The inscription commemorates Abbas the Great's famous pilgrimage on foot from Isfahan to Mashhad and records that he ordered the dome to be gilded using his own wealth. The inscription reads:

"In the name of God, the Most Compassionate, the Most Merciful. Among the greatest blessings bestowed by God was that the supreme sovereign, the ruler of the kings of Arabs and Persians, the noble descendant of the Prophet and the glorious heir of Imam Ali, Shah Abbas al-Mousavi al-Safavi Bahadur Khan, humbly regarded himself as a servant of this radiant and heavenly shrine. He came on foot from his capital, Isfahan, to visit this sacred sanctuary and, from his purest wealth, ordered this dome to be adorned with gold. The work began in the year 1010 AH and was completed in 1016 AH."

Another famous set of inscriptions consists of the four medallion-shaped panels, known collectively as the Four Cartouches. These were added after the dome was repaired following the devastating earthquake during the reign of Shah Suleiman I. This inscription proclaims:

"God Almighty adorned the lowest heaven with stars and embellished the dome of the world with their radiant light. Among His blessings was that the supreme sovereign, the most noble of kings by lineage and character, the promoter of the faith of his pure forefathers and the reviver of the legacy of the Imams, Shah Suleiman al-Safavi al-Mousavi, restored this heavenly dome after it had been damaged by an earthquake. He rebuilt its ruined parts, and now the sacred dome shines once again like the radiant sun. This restoration was completed in the year 1086 AH."

=== Astan Quds Razavi Central Museum ===
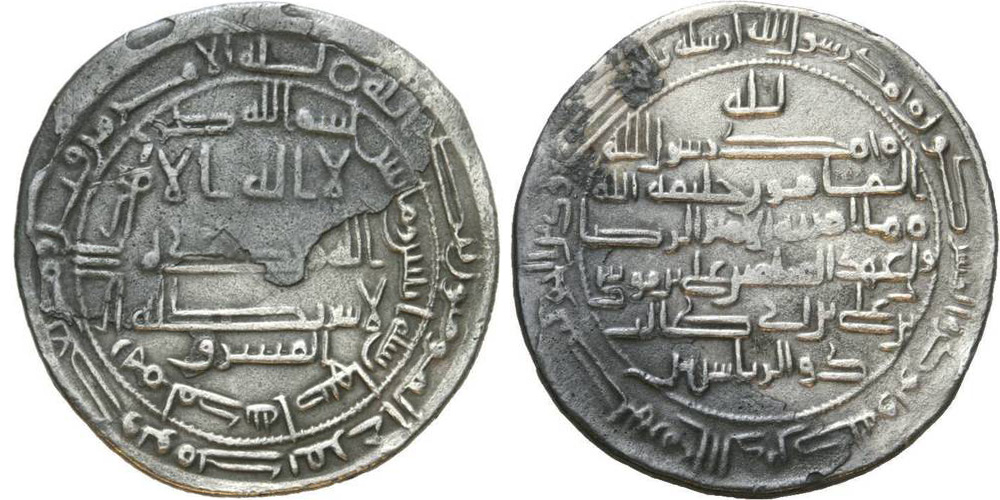
Silver Abbasid dirham minted at Isfahan in 817, citing al-Ma'mun as caliph and Imam Reza as heir apparent (wali ahd al-muslimin). Preserved at the Astan Quds Razavi Central Museum.

The Astan Quds Razavi Central Museum is the shrine's museum, and one of the largest and most important museum complexes in West Asia. Located within the shrine complex, it preserves the treasures of the shrine, objects related to Imam Reza, as well as centuries of donated artworks, manuscripts, and historical objects. The museum was founded in 1937, although the present building dates to 1977.

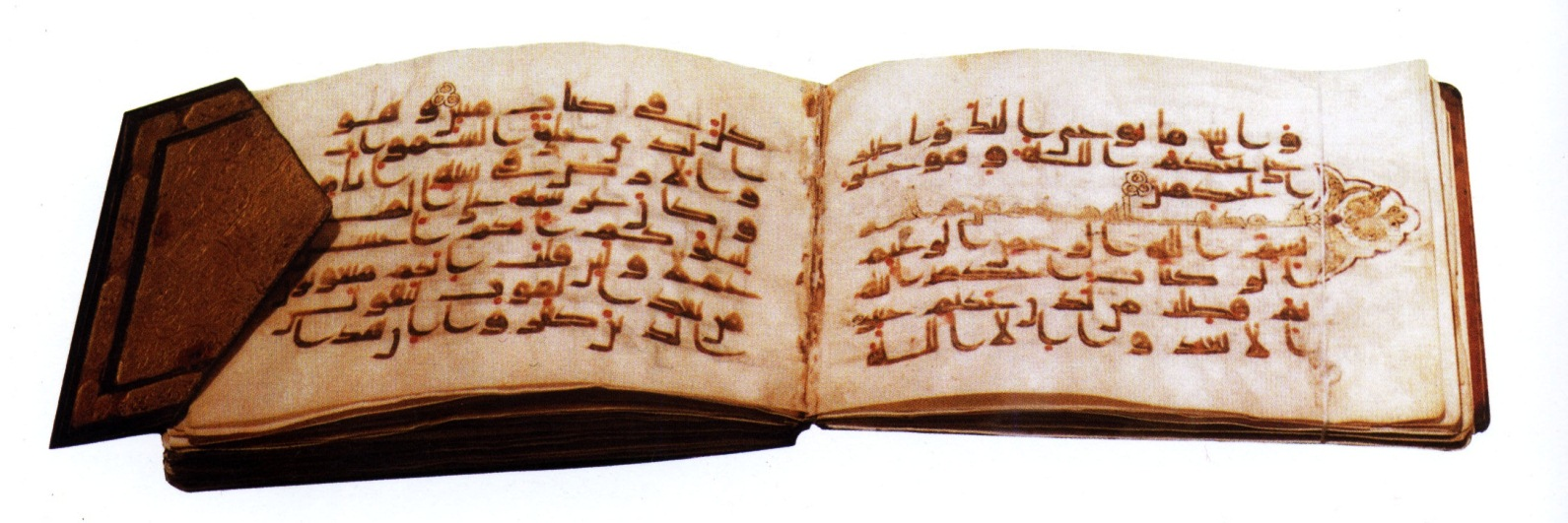
A copy of the Quran ascribed to Imam Reza, preserved at the Astan Quds Razavi Central Museum.

The museum complex is spread across four main buildings. It displays the history of the shrine along with collections of coins, medals, weapons and armor, astronomical instruments, clocks, ceramics, visual arts, shells, stamps, and paper money. The Quran and Rare Objects Museum houses priceless handwritten Qurans, illuminated manuscripts, gifts presented to the shrine, and works by the renowned Iranian artist Mahmoud Farshchian. The Carpet Museum exhibits historic Persian carpets, many of which were donated to the shrine over several centuries.

The Anthropology Museum, explores traditional Iranian daily life and culture. The museum's collections include thousands of historical artifacts, such as rare Qurans, Safavid and Qajar carpets, ceremonial weapons, coins, medals, clocks, scientific instruments, precious gemstones, ceramics, manuscripts, and objects that have been donated to the shrine by rulers, scholars, and pilgrims over the course of more than a thousand years.

=== The Central Library of Astan Quds Razavi ===
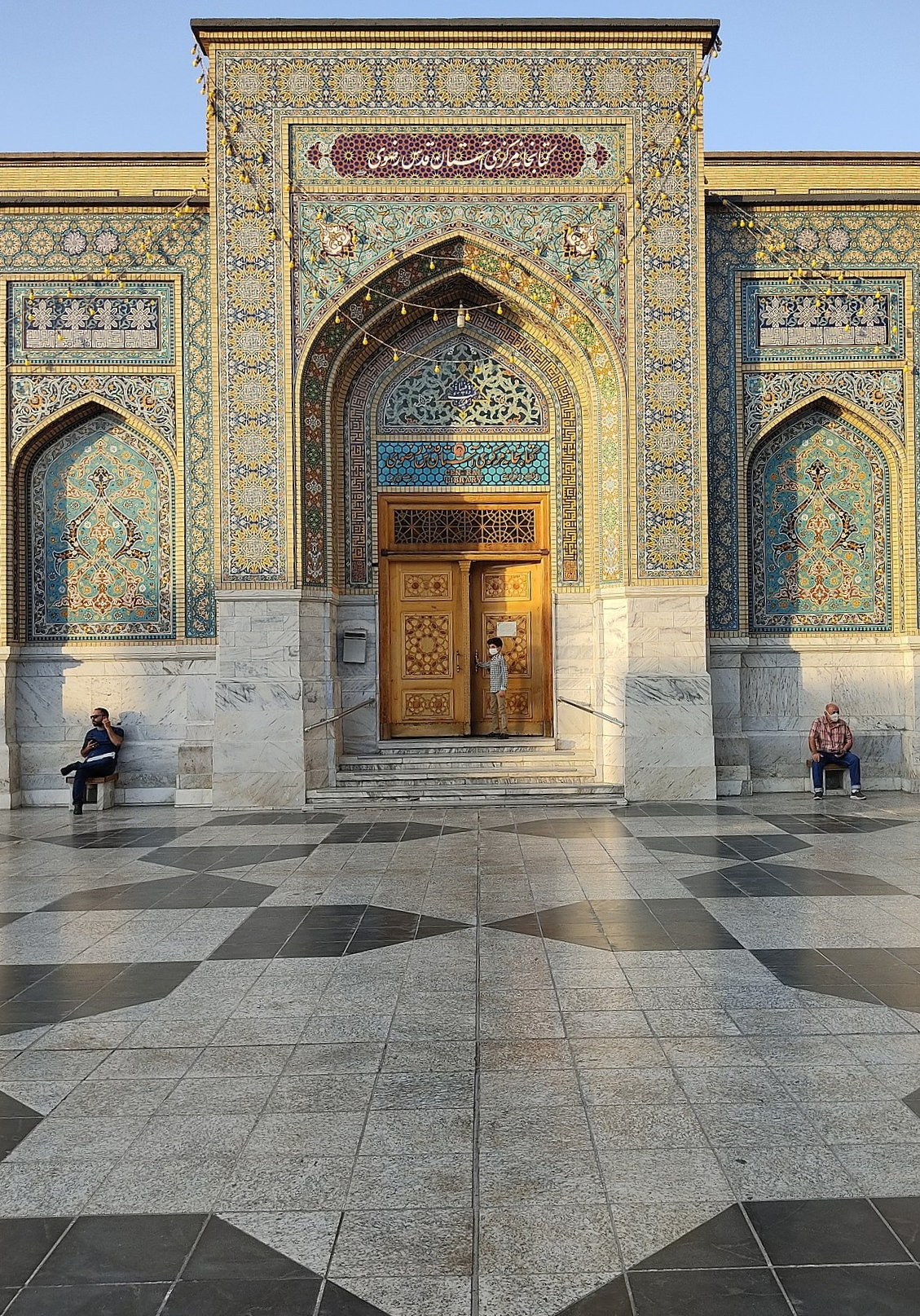
The Central Library of Astan Quds Razavi, one of the oldest libraries in the Islamic world.

The Central Library of Astan Quds Razavi is the official library of the Imam Reza Shrine and is one of the oldest libraries in the Islamic world, dating to 974 AD. It is widely recognized as one of the most important centers for Islamic and religious studies. In historical sources, this library has been referred to by many names, such as “Quran House of the Shrine,” “Blessed Library,” and “Library of Mashhad-e Reza,” among others. Under its supervision, dozens of libraries (about 47 branches) were managed across Mashhad and other cities in Iran and abroad, including places like India.

Today, the Central Library holds approximately one million volumes, including more than 242,000 handwritten manuscripts. Among them are around 94,000 handwritten Qurans, making it one of the richest manuscript collections in the world. In addition to books, the collection includes about 4 million historical documents and over 61,000 microfilm reels. Another important library in the shrine complex is the Goharshad Mosque Library, located opposite the Goharshad Mosque. Its architectural style is inspired by the Ganjali Khan Bath in Kerman. It contains around 65,000 volumes in Persian, Arabic, and Latin, and serves as a key research and reading space within the shrine complex.

=== Razavi University of Islamic Sciences ===
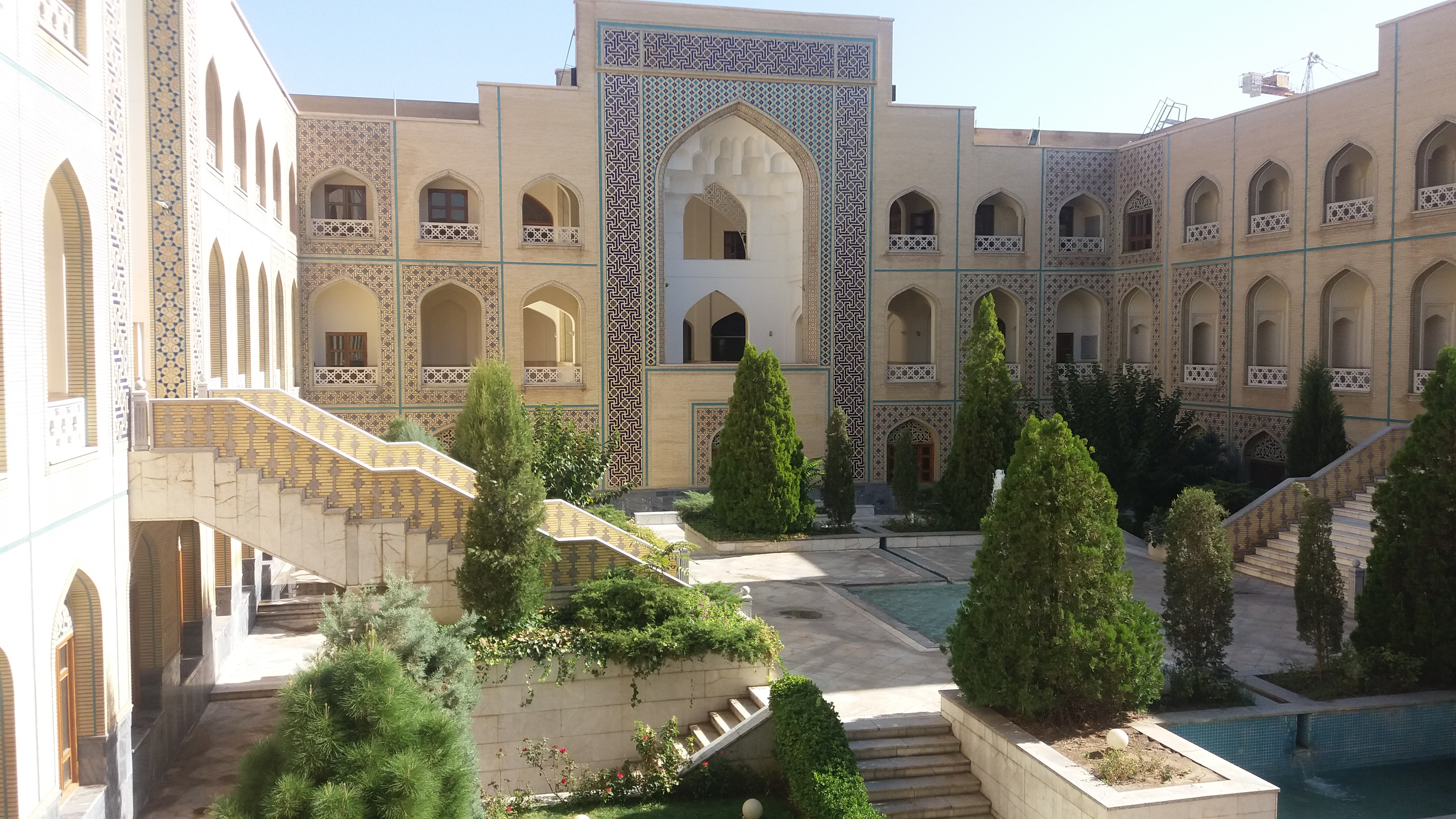
A courtyard of the Razavi University of Islamic Sciences, located in the shrine. The university plays an important role in training scholars and specialists in Shia Islamic thought.

Razavi University of Islamic Sciences is located in the shrine. It was established in 1984 through the efforts of Ayatollah Abbas Vaez Tabasi under the supervision of Astan Quds Razavi. The university was created by merging and revitalizing older seminary schools, some of which date back several centuries, into a modern academic structure. It operates as a hybrid between a traditional Islamic seminary (hawza) and a formal university. That means students study both classical Islamic sciences, such as jurisprudence (fiqh), Quranic studies, hadith, theology, and Islamic philosophy, and in some departments, more contemporary academic subjects like law, Arabic, and English.

Its main mission is to train scholars, researchers, teachers, and specialists in Islamic studies and related fields, especially those who can serve in educational, judicial, and religious institutions. The environment of the university is strongly religious and closely connected to the spiritual atmosphere of Mashhad. Because of its location next to the shrine, it is often described as a place where academic life and religious devotion overlap. It is also officially recognized by Iran’s Ministry of Science, Research and Technology, meaning its degrees are valid within the national higher education system. It is considered one of Iran’s key institutions for Islamic studies, combining seminary tradition with a structured university framework, and playing an important role in training scholars and specialists in Shia Islamic thought.

=== Dar al-shifa ===
Historical sources mention that a hospital (dar al-shifa/dispensary) once operated alongside the Imam Reza Shrine, where poor and needy people could go for medical treatment and care. The earliest references to physicians and medical services at the shrine date back to the Safavid period. However, an even earlier endowment document records that Atiq Ali ibn Ahmad ibn Malik Ismail al-Tusi donated properties to the shrine, with their income specifically dedicated to treating poor patients. Today, the shrine’s medical center continues this tradition on a large scale, treating around 500,000 patients per year, and its pharmacy is considered one of the largest in Mashhad. In addition to the main medical complex in Mashhad, the Astan Quds system has also supported healthcare facilities in other cities, including Imam Reza Hospital in Sirjan, the Razavi Rehabilitation Center in Rafsanjan, and Mortazavi Hospital in Jahanabad Nowq.

=== The Guesthouse ===
The Guesthouse of the Imam Reza Shrine is one of the shrine’s main welfare facilities for pilgrims. Traditionally, it has been responsible for preparing meals for visitors and distributing them free of charge. Historical evidence suggests that the practice of serving food to pilgrims at the shrine dates back to at least the 15th century. Due to the increasing number of pilgrims, the original facilities eventually became insufficient, leading to the construction of the current modern guesthouse. The present building is located on the northern side of Bast Shaykh Hur al-Amili. It is a multi-story complex that includes industrial-scale kitchens, large dining halls, special reception halls, and administrative sections, allowing it to serve a very large number of pilgrims efficiently.

=== Kitchen ===
The Kitchen of the Imam Reza Shrine is one of the oldest and most distinctive institutions within the shrine complex. Historical records indicate that a formal kitchen was already operating by the Timurid Empire (15th century), although it may have existed even earlier in a simpler form. Over the centuries, successive dynasties expanded its facilities and endowed it with lands and revenues to ensure its operation. The kitchen's primary purpose has always been to prepare and distribute Nazri (charitable meals) in the name of Imam Reza. Receiving a meal from the shrine's kitchen is considered a special blessing by many pilgrims.

Today, the shrine's kitchen is among the largest institutional kitchens in the world. They use modern industrial equipment while preserving traditional recipes and cooking methods for many dishes. Every day, tens of thousands of meals are prepared and distributed free of charge to pilgrims and visitors, especially during major religious occasions. The kitchen receives 10 to 40 thousand visitors per day and sometimes on occasional events cooks for as many as 250,000. It has an Astan Quds website page and there is an ID register and ticket lottery for a one course meal per person every three years. During Ramadan, the kitchen feeds approximately one million pilgrims and citizens.

=== Zarih ===
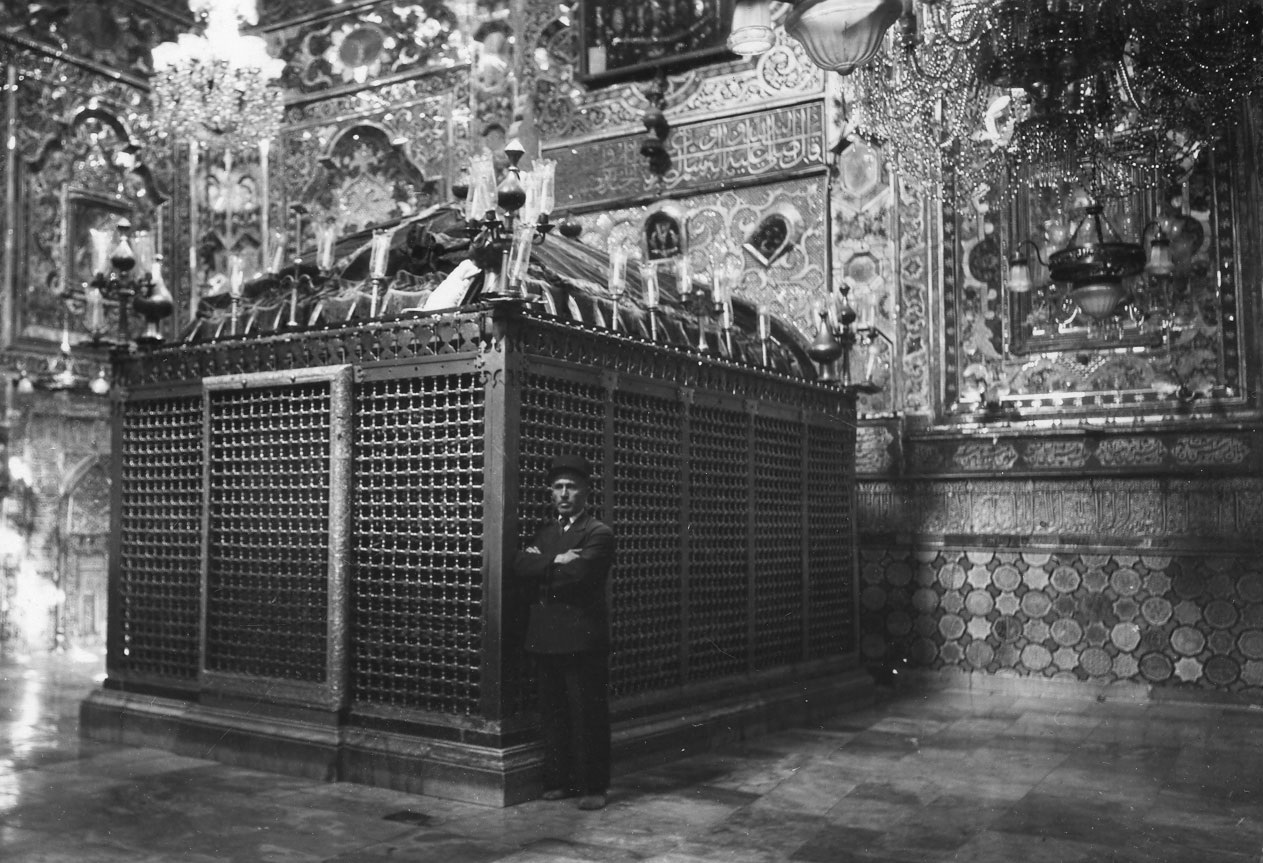
Old photograph of the third zarih in 1936. Installed in 1823, this zarih remained in place for 137 years until 1960, when it was replaced by the fourth zarih. It is now preserved at the Astan Quds Razavi Central Museum.

There is no available historical information about how many zarihs have been placed over the grave of Imam Reza prior to the Safavid Empire. The first historically recorded zarih was installed during the Safavid period in 16th century, and since then, five different zarihs have been placed over the grave. The first zarih dates back to the reign of Tahmasp I (1524- 1576). It was made of pure wood, decorated with gold and silver. After it deteriorated, the second zarih known as the “Negin-Neshan” (Gem-Studded) was installed. This structure, made of decorated steel and adorned with rubies and emeralds, was donated by Shahrukh Mirza, the grandson of Nader Shah, in 1747. It featured intricate latticework with multiple openings, and remained under later zarihs for over 260 years.

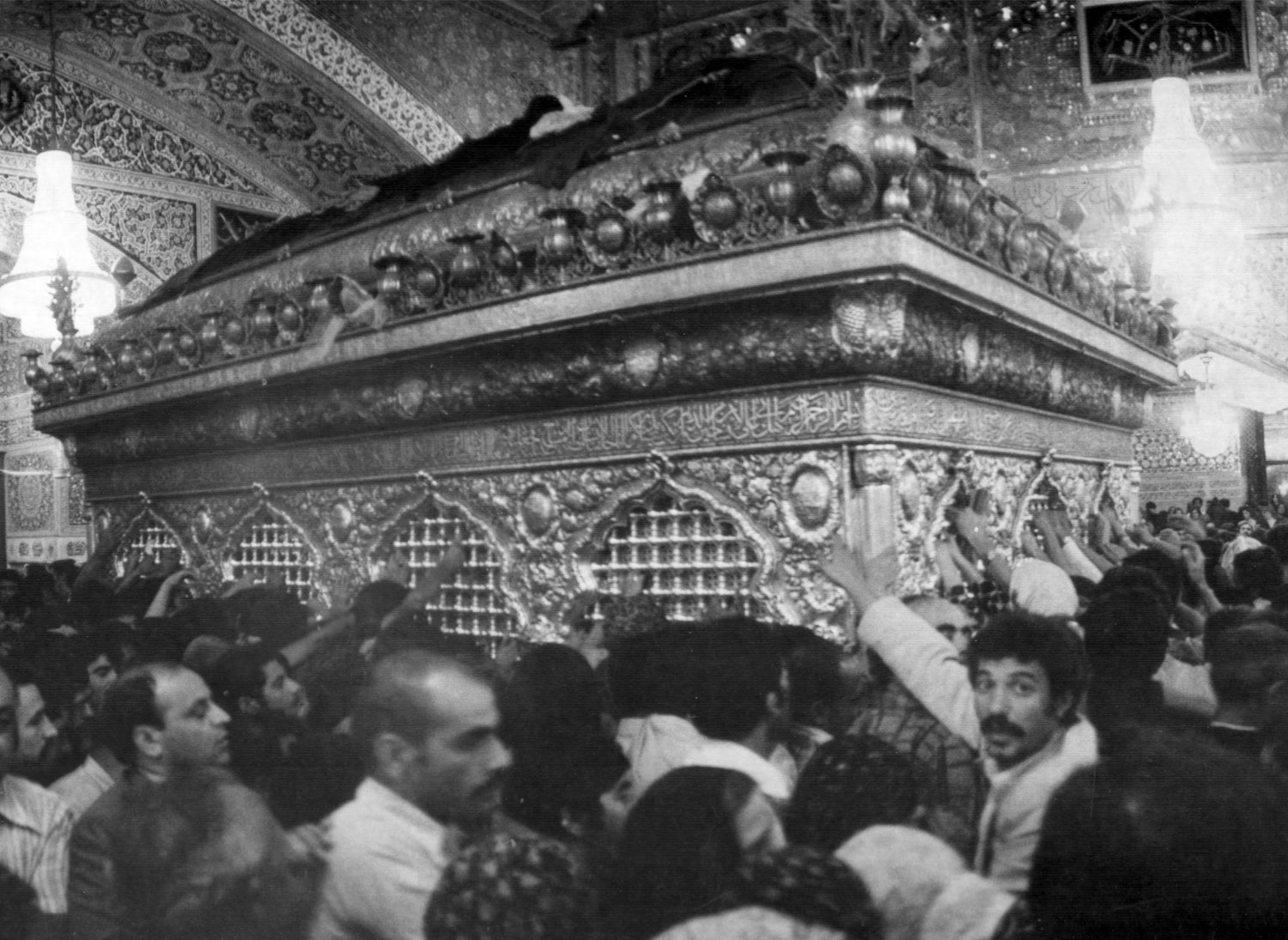
Pilgrims around the fourth zarih in 1979. Installed in 1960, this zarih remained in place for over 40 years until 2001, when it was replaced by the fifth and current zarih. It is now preserved at the Astan Quds Razavi Central Museum.

During the reign of Fath-Ali Shah Qajar, the third zarih made of steel was installed over the second one. It was decorated with gold plating and jewel-inlaid rings, and inscriptions of Surah Yaseen and Surah Al-Insan in Thuluth script were engraved on it. This zarih remained in place until when it was removed due to structural deterioration and its now on display at the shrine's museum. After its removal, the fourth zarih, known as the "Lion and Sugar", was installed. It was designed to enclose the second zarih inside it. It had fourteen lattice sections and was a masterpiece of traditional Iranian metalwork. The project was overseen by Seyed Abolhasan Hafizian, with master craftsmen from Isfahan working under Mohammad-Taqi Zofon. Gold grape motifs were placed at its corners, and verses of Surah Yaseen were engraved in Thuluth script around it. This zarih remained in place for 41 years before being transferred to the shrine's museum. After that, due to wear and structural weakening of the fourth zarih, plans were made for its replacement.

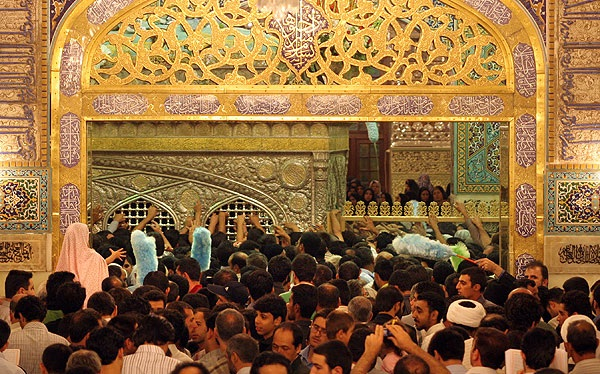
Pilgrims touching the fifth and current zarih. Installed in 2001, it remains in place today. During its installation, the historic zarih of the Afsharid era, which had remained beneath later zarihs since 1747, was transferred to the shrine's museum.

After years of study, the design of the fifth zarih was ultimately chosen from a proposal by the famed Iranian artist Mahmoud Farshchian. Construction took nearly seven years and resulted in a masterpiece of art weighing about 12 tons. It was built using steel, iron, gold, and silver. The fifth zarih, which is the current one, is known as "Silver and Gold", and includes fourteen decorative arches symbolizing the Fourteen Infallibles, all converging toward a larger central arch representing “Allah.” Surah Yaseen and Surah Al-Insan are inscribed on it in gold and silver Thuluth calligraphy. The metal engraving was carried out by Khodadad Esfahani, while the calligraphy was done by Moahhed. It's installation coincided with Eid al-Adha, officially reopening the shrine with the fifth zarih in place. During its installation, the historic zarih of the Afsharid era, which had remained beneath later zarihs since 1747, was removed after more than 260 years and transferred to the shrine's museum. Thanks to this, pilgrims since 2001 can look through the current zarih and obtain a clear view of Imam Reza's burial stone.

=== The Window of Steel ===
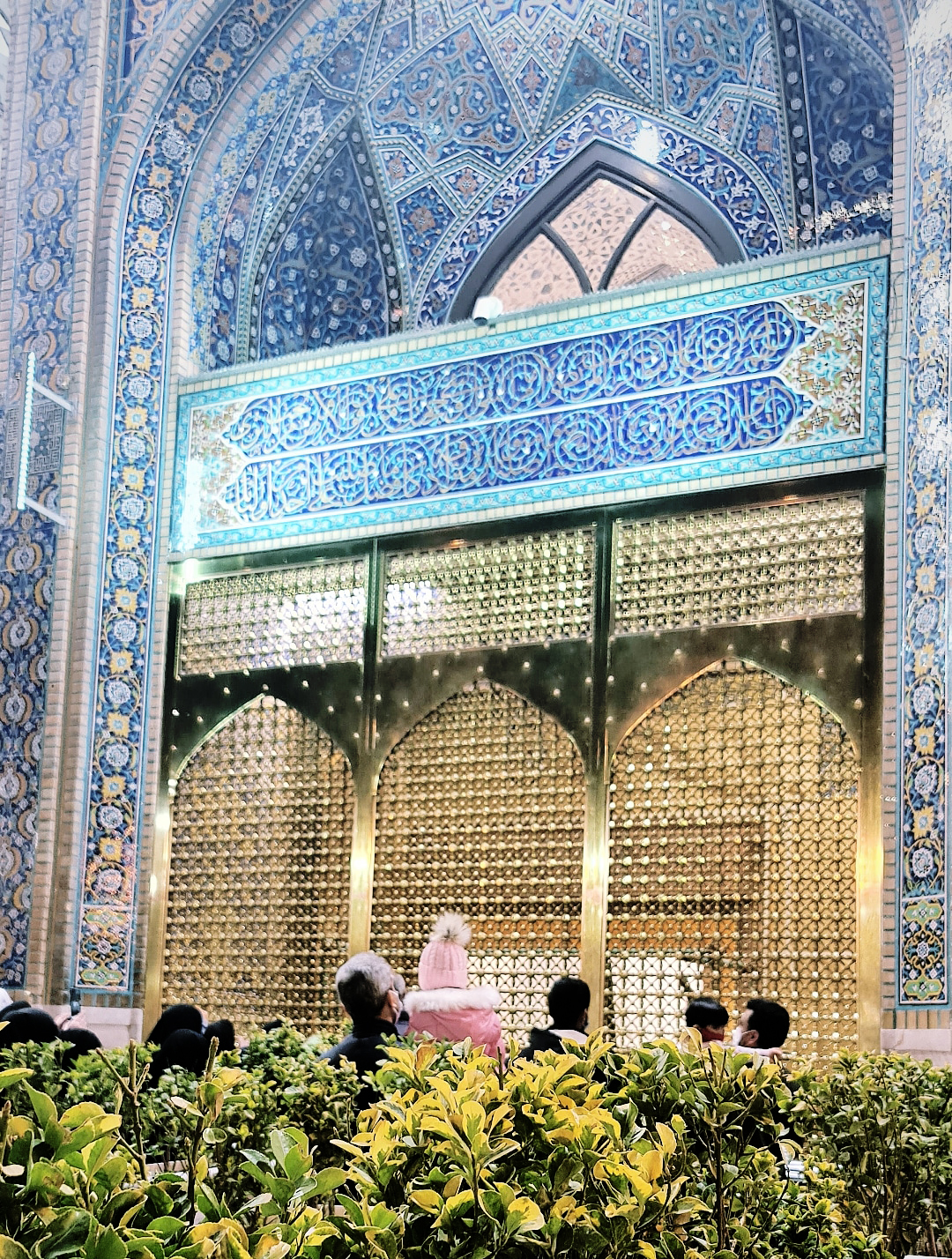
The Window of Steel is one of the most famous parts of the shrine. Positioned near the burial chamber (zarih), it allows pilgrims who cannot enter the immediate area around the tomb to stand near it. Over time, it became one of the most important places in the shrine for seeking blessings and spiritual reflection.

The Window of Steel is one of the most famous parts of the Imam Reza Shrine. Located in the Enqelab Coutryard, it is positioned near the burial chamber (zarih), allowing pilgrims who cannot enter the immediate area around the tomb to stand near it. Over time, it became one of the most important places in the shrine for supplication, seeking blessings, and spiritual reflection. The tradition of the steel window dates back several centuries. One of the earliest known examples was created during the Timurid period.

According to records of the shrine, a decorated steel window was made in 1393 CE by order of Sultan Shah Rukh and presented to the shrine. This historic window, featuring fine metalwork and gilded decoration, is now preserved in the Astan Quds Razavi Central Museum. The present Steel Window is a continuation of this tradition. Throughout different periods, the window has been repaired, replaced, and redesigned as the shrine expanded and changed. Its original architectural purpose was to provide pilgrims with a point of access and visual connection to the tomb, especially during times when the inner areas were limited. However, because of its location and the large number of people who gathered there, it gradually gained a special spiritual significance.

Architecturally, the Steel Window consists of an intricate metal lattice through which visitors can look toward the zarih. Pilgrims traditionally place their hands on the metalwork, recite prayers, and make personal supplications. The location is associated with tawassul (seeking intercession), barakah (blessing), and prayers for healing and relief from difficulties. Over the centuries, numerous accounts of miracles and answered prayers have been associated with the Steel Window. These include stories of people suffering from illnesses or hardships who reported recovery or relief after praying at this location. The Steel Window also became connected with popular customs among pilgrims.

=== The Tomb ===
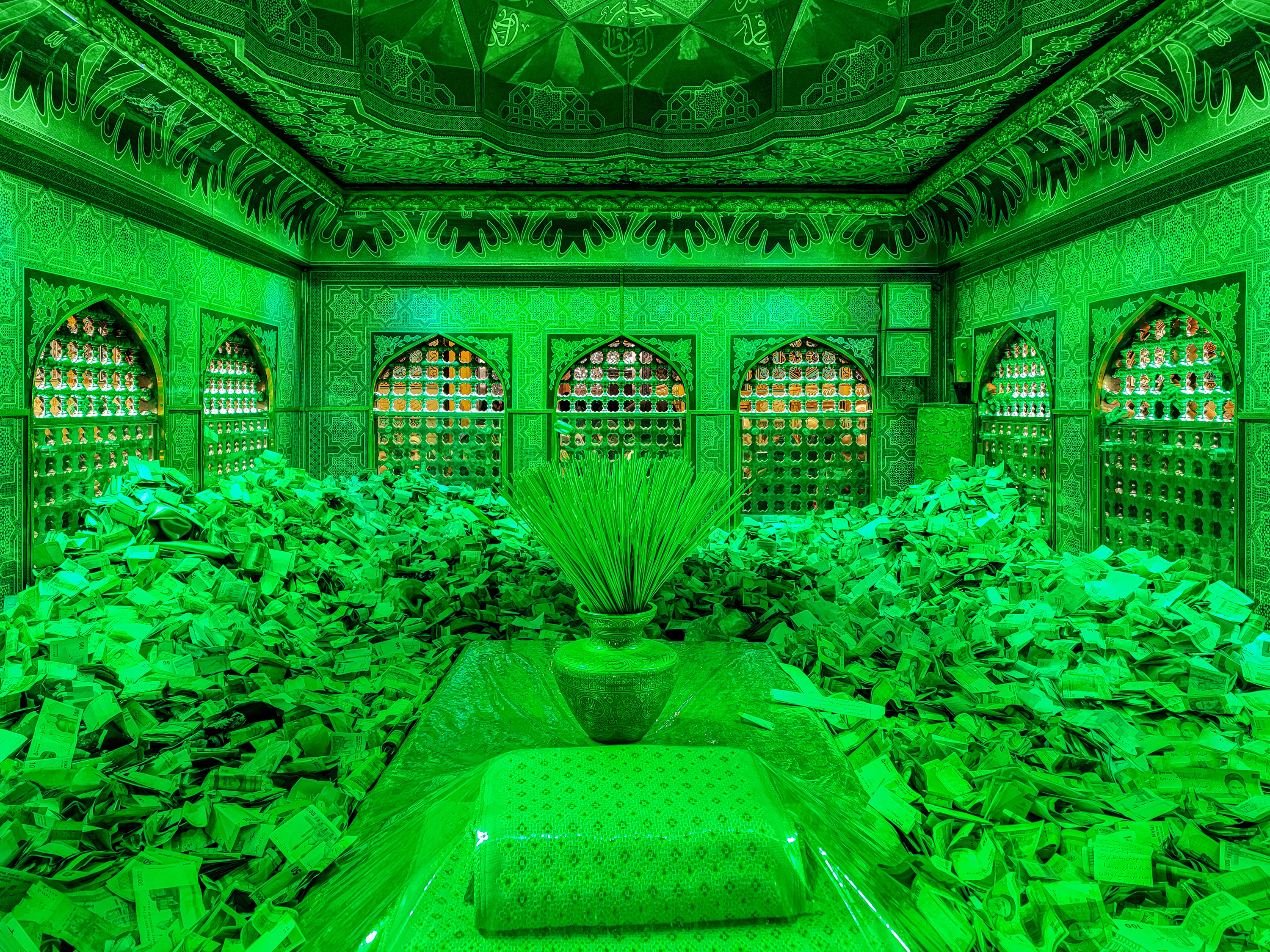
Inside the zarih, with a view from the sacred tomb.

From the early 12th century, a wooden chest was placed over the sacred grave. It was made from high-quality wood and decorated with silver fittings. This chest was donated to the shrine in 1106 CE by a Zoroastrian from Isfahan. It remained in the crypt for centuries until it deteriorated. In 1932, it was removed and its darkened fittings were polished. The gold from it was later used to purchase endowment properties for the shrine. This chest, known as the “Abbasid Chest”, is now preserved in the shrine's museum.

Three inscribed burial stones have been used for the grave of Imam Reza. The first stone dates back to 1122 CE from the Seljuk era, made of marble. It contained inscriptions in Kufic script, making it highly valuable in terms of both antiquity and calligraphic significance. It's preserved at the shrine's museum. The second burial stone, placed in the 17th century during the Safavid Empire, was made of white limestone marble. The third burial stone, which is the current one, is made from marble extracted from the Turanposht mine near Yazd. It was placed over the sacred grave alongside the installation of the fifth zarih in 2001, and bears the following inscription:

This is the noble resting place of the pious, pure, truthful, and martyred Imam, the heir of the Prophets and Messengers, the eighth of the Infallible Imams from the Household of the Messenger of the Lord of the Worlds, God's proof over all creation, our master and lord Abu al-Hasan al-Reza, whose father was al-Kazim, whose father was al-Sadiq, whose father was al-Baqir, whose father was al-Sajjad, whose father was al-Husayn, whose father was Ali—may God's blessings and peace be upon them all. He was born in Medina on the 11th of Dhu al-Qa'dah in the year 148 AH and was martyred in Tus at the end of Safar in the year 203 AH.

=== Other burials ===
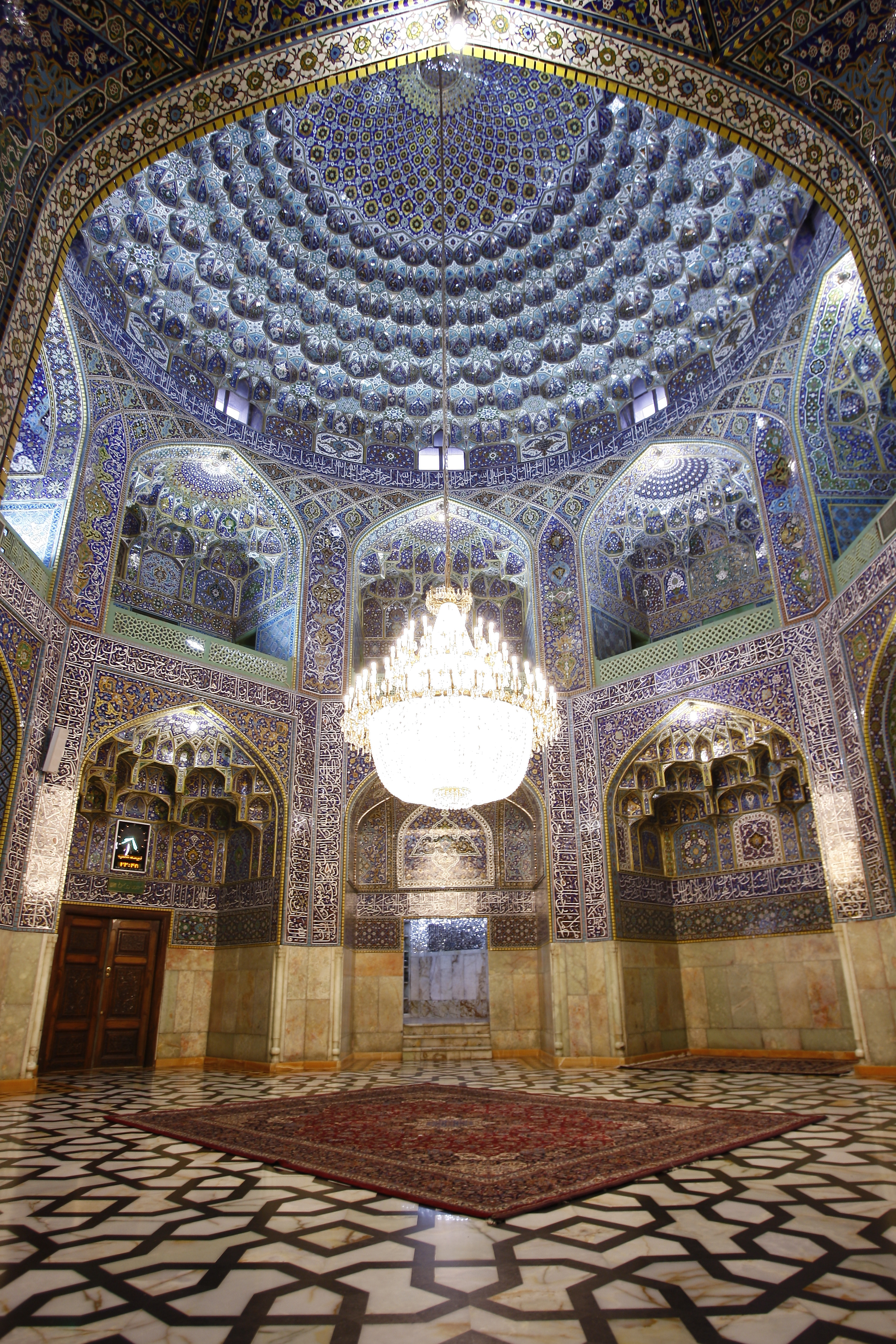
Inside the Allahverdi Khan dome, where the Safavid general Allahverdi Khan is buried.

The shrine is the burial site for many notable individuals, including members of the Timurid, Safavid and Qajar dynasties, alongside the Abbasid caliph Harun al-Rashid, polymath Sheikh Baha’i, Crown Prince Abbas Mirza, Supreme Leader Ali Khamenei, and many other notable political figures, scholars, and clerics. The Safavid general, Allahverdi Khan, is buried under the Allahverdi Khan dome. The Timurid Prince and Princess, Abul-Qasim Babur Mirza and Sevin Beg Khanzada, are also buried at the shrine. The Safavid Queen and consort of King Tahmasp I, Sultanum Begum, is buried at the shrine. Consort of Safavid Prince and mother of King Safi, Dilaram Khanum, is buried at the shrine. Qajar Princes Mohammad Taqi Mirza, Ashraf os-Saltaneh and Mass'oud Mirza Zell-e Soltan are all buried at the shrine.

The tomb of Sheikh Hur al-Amili is located in the northeast of Enghelab Courtyard, while the tomb of Shaykh Tabarsi is situated in the western area near the Sheikh Tabarsi circulation route. There is also the tomb of Hasan Ali Nakhodaki, another well-known spiritual figure. In addition, several prominent scholars and philosophers are buried within or around the shrine, including Hassan Ali Morvarid and Mohammad-Taqi Jafari. Other scholars and philosophers buried at the shrine are Ahmed Aref El-Zein, Muhammad Baqir Sharif Tabatabae, Mirza Abutaleb Zanjani, Mohammad Ezodin Hosseini Zanjani, Abdullah Musawi Shirazi, Abdolkarim Hasheminejad, and Mohammad Hadi al-Milani. Beyond individual mausoleums, there is a massive underground cemetery complex called Behesht-e Saman, located beneath several courtyards. It is a three-section cemetery.

== Astan Quds Razavi ==
The Astan Quds Razavi is a bonyad based in Mashhad. It is the administrative organization which manages the Imam Reza shrine and various institutions which belong to the organization. It is one of the largest religious foundations in the world. The administrative apparatus of Astan Quds Razavi is considered the longest-lasting organization since the martyrdom of Imam Reza about 1,200 years ago. The main resource of the institution is endowments. The Astan Quds Razavi is a major player in the economy of the Mashhad city. It owns hundreds of companies and institutions around the country. The organization by order of Ruhollah Khomeini was tax exempt for 35 years until 2019. Today, Astan Quds Razavi holds vast assets, including land, businesses, and industries. Although its exact assets are not publicly disclosed, economists and researchers generally regard Astan Quds Razavi as one of the wealthiest and most influential religious foundations in the world.

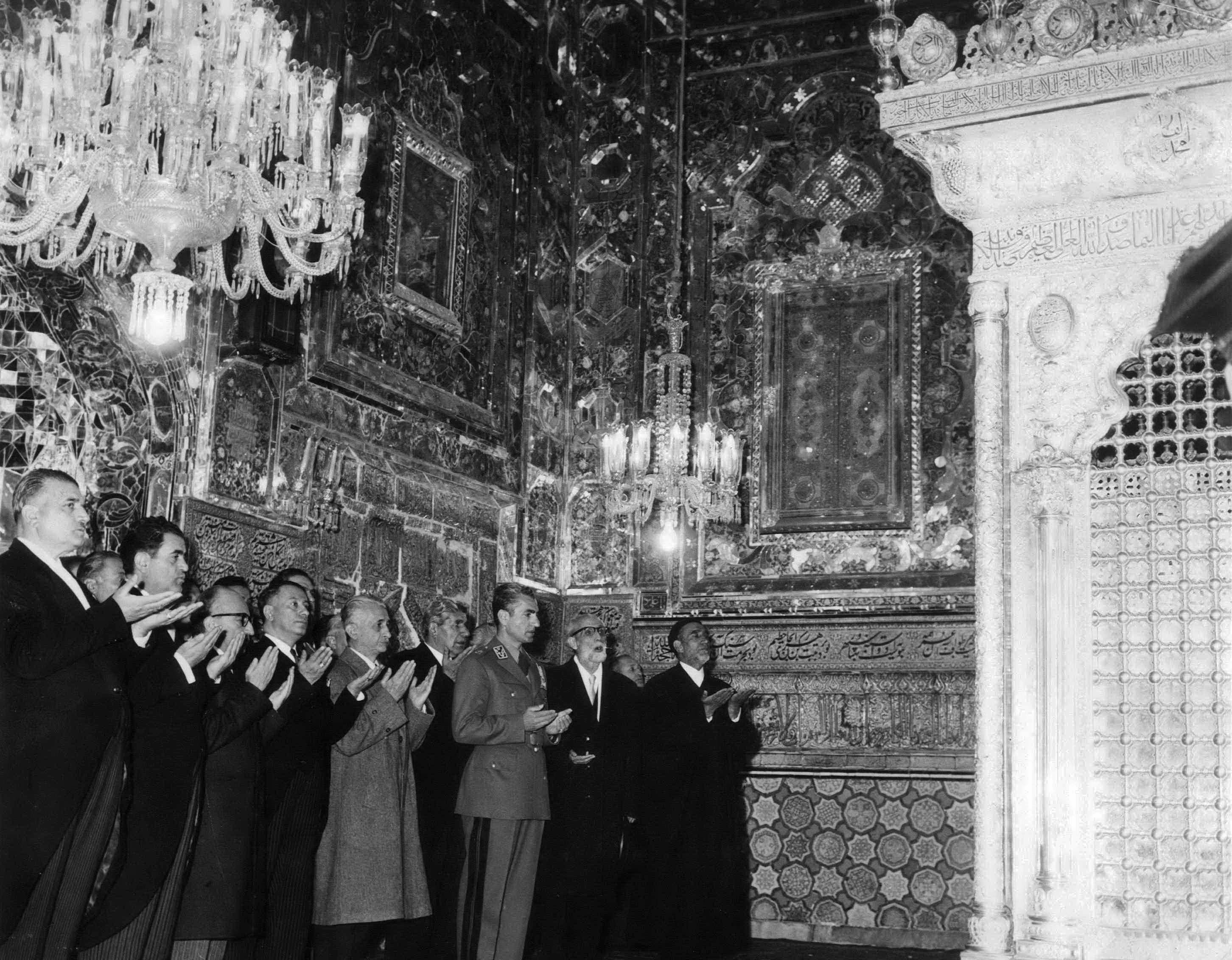
Mohammad Reza Shah Pahlavi praying in front of the zarih, 1961.

Since the Iranian Revolution, the bonyad has grown into a conglomerate employing 19,000 people and running auto plants, agriculture, industry, mining, construction, pharmaceuticals, healthcare, education, publishing, museums, libraries, real estate and many other enterprises. The shrine's land has grown fourfold since the revolution. The foundation owns most of the real estate in Mashhad and rents out shop space to bazaars and hoteliers. According to British journalist Christopher de Bellaigue, "when asked to identify the most important man in the city, Mashhadis do not name the mayor but rather the head of Astan Quds Razavi." Ayatollah Abbas Vaez-Tabasi had been the head of the conglomerate since the revolution in 1979 until his death in 2016. Ebrahim Raisi succeeded him in March 2016 and held office until April 2019. The current head of the organization, Ahmad Marvi, was appointed in 2019 by former Supreme Leader Ali Khamenei, and continues to serve in the position.

== People associated with the shrine ==
The administration and trusteeship of the shrine has evolved over many centuries. In the early Islamic period, especially during the Samanid era, the shrine had attendants and custodians who opened and closed the tomb door daily. For centuries, the shrine was mainly administered by naqibs (leaders of the sayyids of Tus), who were responsible for both religious leadership and the custodianship of the shrine. A major turning point came with the construction of the Goharshad Mosque and the expansion of waqf (endowment) institutions. During the Safavid dynasty, especially after Shia Islam became the official religion of Iran, the shrine gained immense political and economic importance.

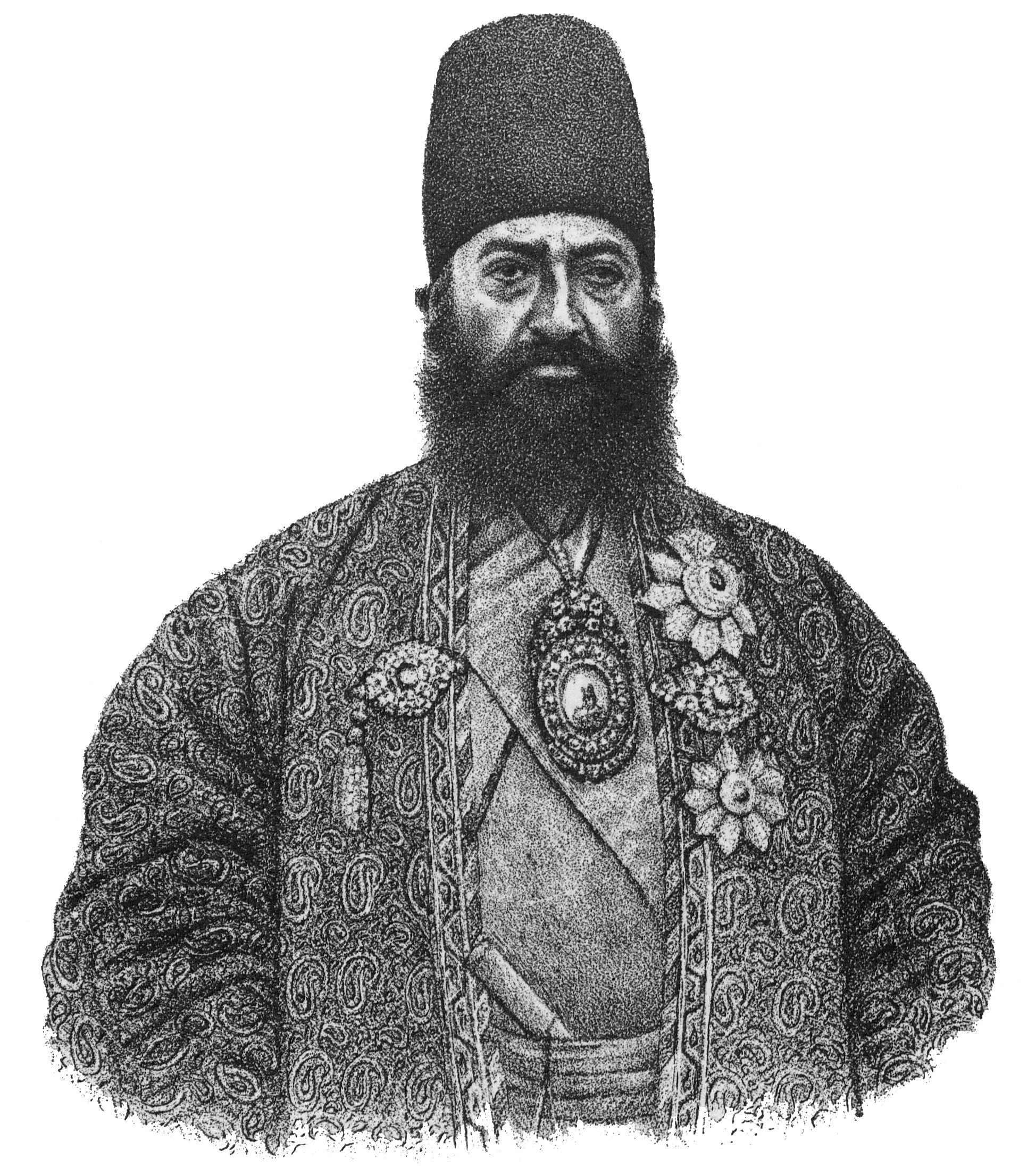
Fath-Ali Khan Saheb Divan (1821–1858), one of the custodians of the shrine during the Qajar Empire.

A formal administrative structure called the “tawliyat” (custodianship) was established. The Safavid kings appointed a representative known as the mutawalli to manage the shrine’s affairs. During the Qajar period, the kings directly appointed deputies to manage the shrine. This system continued until the Iranian Revolution. After the revolution, the management of the shrine was reorganized under the Islamic Republic of Iran, with figures such as Ayatollah Vaez Tabasi serving as custodian, followed later by successors appointed by the country's leadership.

Alongside the administrative system, the shrine has always had a large body of servants (khadam) who carry out daily operations. These include cleaning, washing and maintaining the sacred spaces, floral arrangements, opening and closing doors, and organizing religious ceremonies. Many of them serve voluntarily or honorarily, and by 2012 their number was estimated at around 15,000 people, about half of whom were volunteers. The shrine also maintained a tradition of muezzins (Adhan callers) for centuries. Up to 20 muezzins are active today, calling the adhan in shifts.

== Culture ==
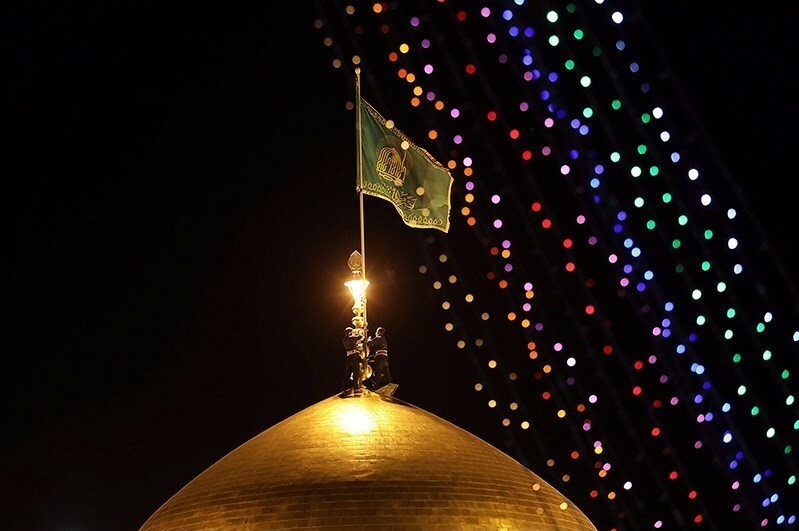
The dome flag replacement ceremony.

Visiting the graves of religious figures holds profound significance in Iranian culture, even before the advent of Islam. Pilgrimage to the Shia Imams is particularly important, and it is often described as “attaining the blessing of visiting the Imam.” Among Iranians, this act is considered highly meritorious, and visiting the shrine of the Imam Reza Shrine is one of the most important examples of such devotion. James Morier reports that the goal of pilgrims visiting shrine is salvation from hell and attainment of paradise, and even the plants growing around the shrine were considered sacred by pilgrims, who used them as talismans and healing objects. He also describes the shrine as the most famous and sacred place in Iran, noting that people performed various rituals there for healing and fulfillment of wishes, such as kissing the shrine’s enclosure and other devotional practices.

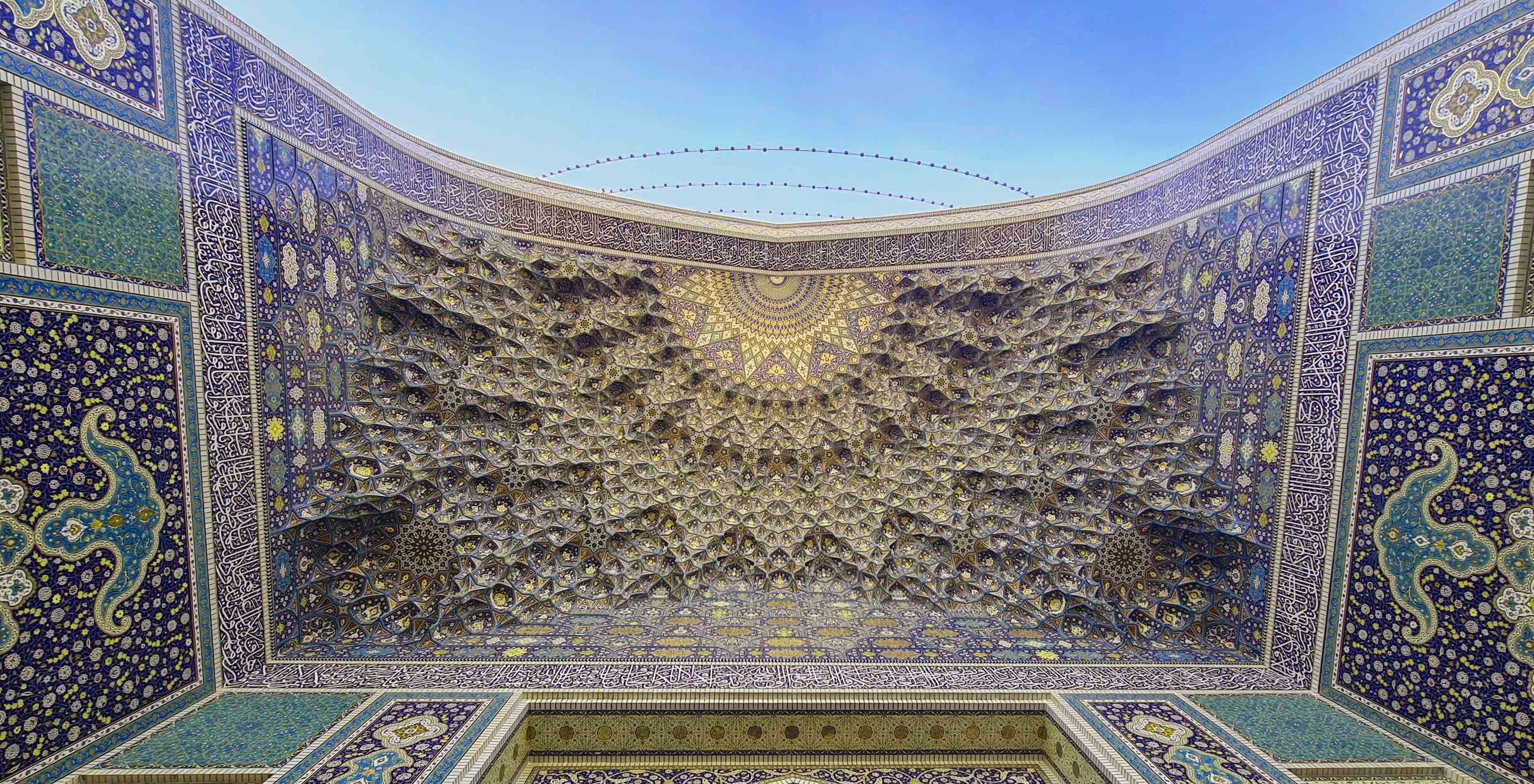
Muqarnas vaulting in the Vali Asr iwan.

Because of the shrine’s sacred status, individuals seeking justice or pardon, whether victims or even criminals, sometimes sought refuge there. Another important tradition of the shrine is the use of flags and standards, although its exact origin is unclear. During the Timurid period, banners were used during ceremonies welcoming rulers and dignitaries. Manuscripts also depict a shrine flag decorated with the names of the Fourteen Infallibles. In the Safavid era, flag-bearers were mentioned as part of the shrine’s ceremonial staff. In the Pahlavi period, a standardized green flag was introduced, bearing the inscription “There is no god but Allah” on one side, and “Sultan Ali ibn Musa al-Reza” on the other. After the Iranian Revolution, the flag was modified, bearing the 13th verse of Surah as-Saff of the Quran: "Help from Allah and a near victory." During special mourning occasions such as Muharram and martyrdoms anniversaries, it is replaced with a black flag. Another long-standing tradition is that pilgrims spend the final hours of the Persian year within the courtyards, porticoes, and surroundings of the shrine, welcoming the New Year in this sacred space. Dust Clearing is another religious ceremony. It is a ritual for cleansing, sweeping, washing, and perfume-spraying inside the zarih and the tomb itself. This ritual is also performed at the Kaaba in Masjid al-Haram, as well as at other shrines.

=== Artistic heritage and poetry ===
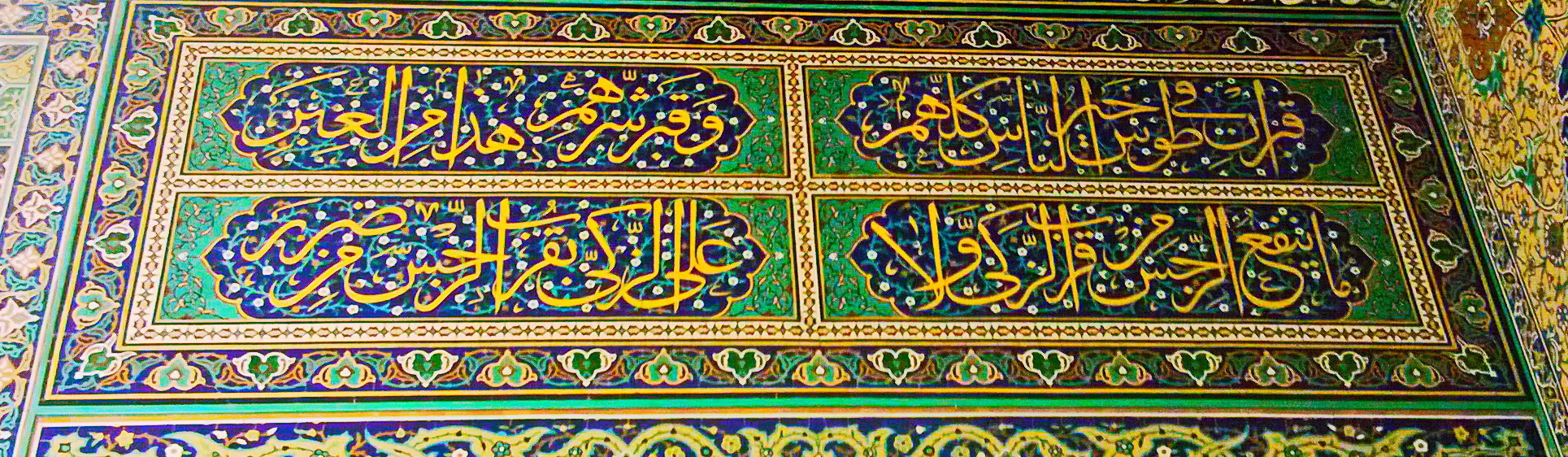
"In Tus lie two graves: the grave of the best of people (Imam Reza) and the grave of the worst among them (Harun al-Rashid). Such are the lessons of time: the impure gains nothing from being near the righteous, and the righteous suffers no harm from being near the impure."- By the Arab poet Di'bil al-Khuza'i

The Imam Reza Shrine has been celebrated in Persian literature for centuries. Numerous poets have mentioned the tomb. Two of the most famous Persian poets of the 12th century, Sanai and Khaqani Shirvani, are recorded as having visited the shrine and composed poetry praising both the pilgrimage and the sanctity of the site. Their works helped establish the shrine as a major spiritual and literary symbol in Persian culture. The shrine is renowned for its rich artistic and architectural decoration, much of which has survived for centuries. In the 12th century, the lower walls of the shrine chamber were decorated with exceptional lusterware tiles known as Sanjari tiles. These rare golden-glazed ceramic tiles are still preserved within the shrine and are among its oldest surviving decorative elements.

Beneath one of the minarets is a Thuluth calligraphic inscription, completed in 1729–1730 CE by Baha al-Din Mohammad al-Khadim, containing blessings upon the Prophet Muhammad and the Twelve Imams. Another famous inscription appears on the Nadiri Minaret above the Abbasi Iwan, where similar invocations are written in elegant Thuluth script on gilded bricks. Mirror work is another hallmark of the shrine's artistic heritage. Introduced during the Safavid period, it first adorned the central sanctuary and was later extended to many halls and porticoes. Some sections combine clear mirrors with colored glass to create dazzling visual effects. The shrine also showcases a remarkable variety of traditional Islamic decorative arts, including calligraphy, tilework, muqarnas, decorative brickwork, stucco carving, and mosaic faience.

== Gallery ==
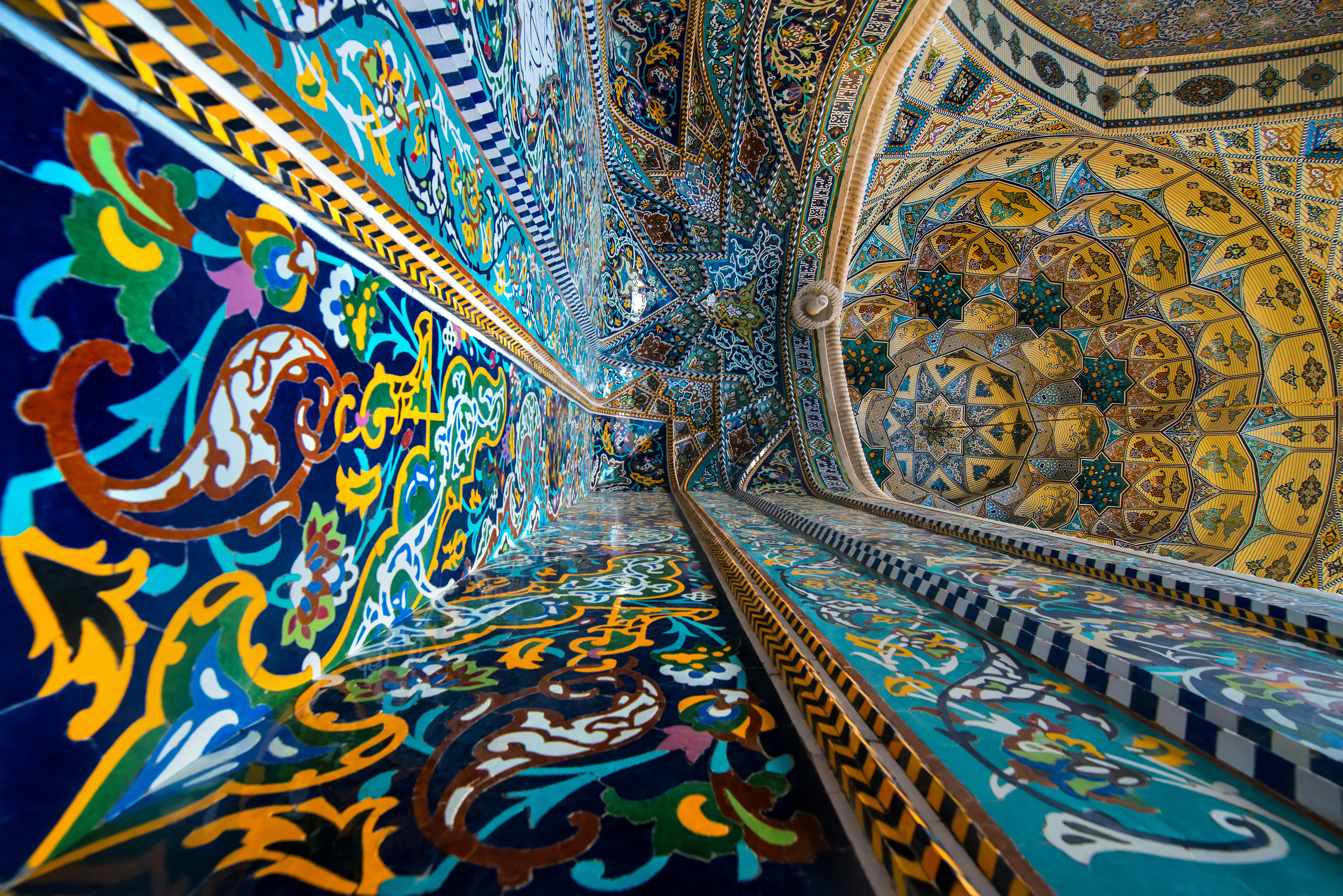

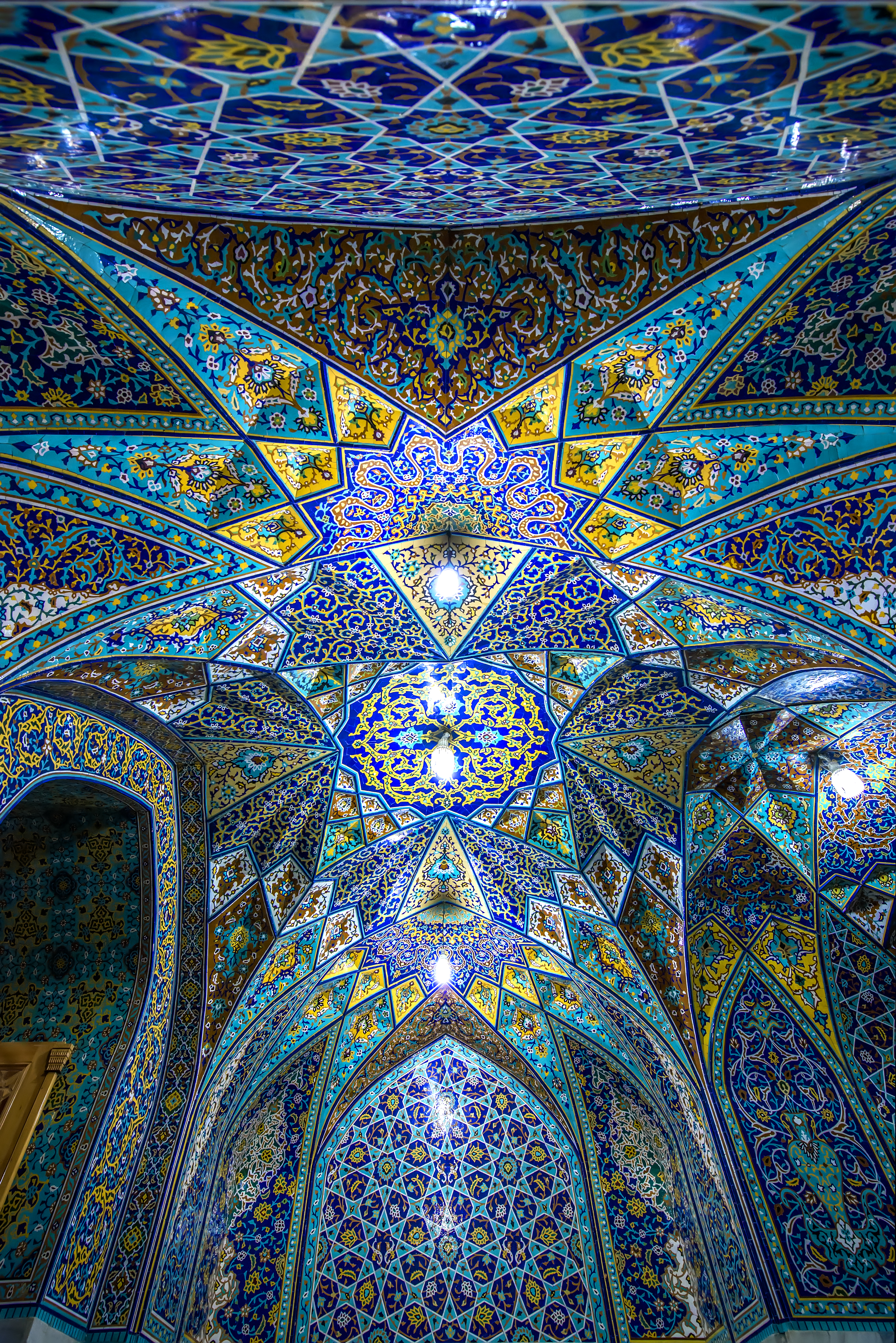

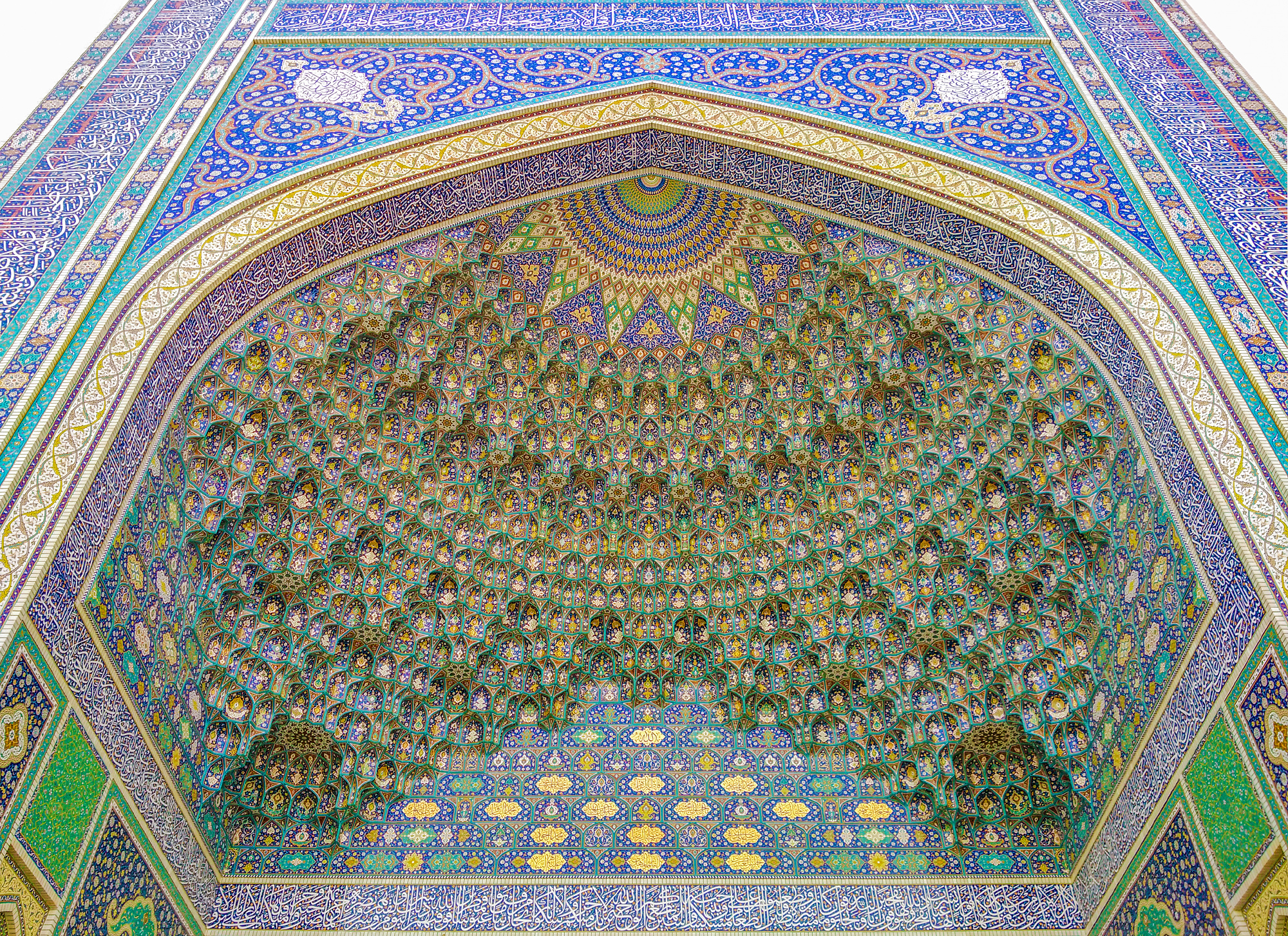

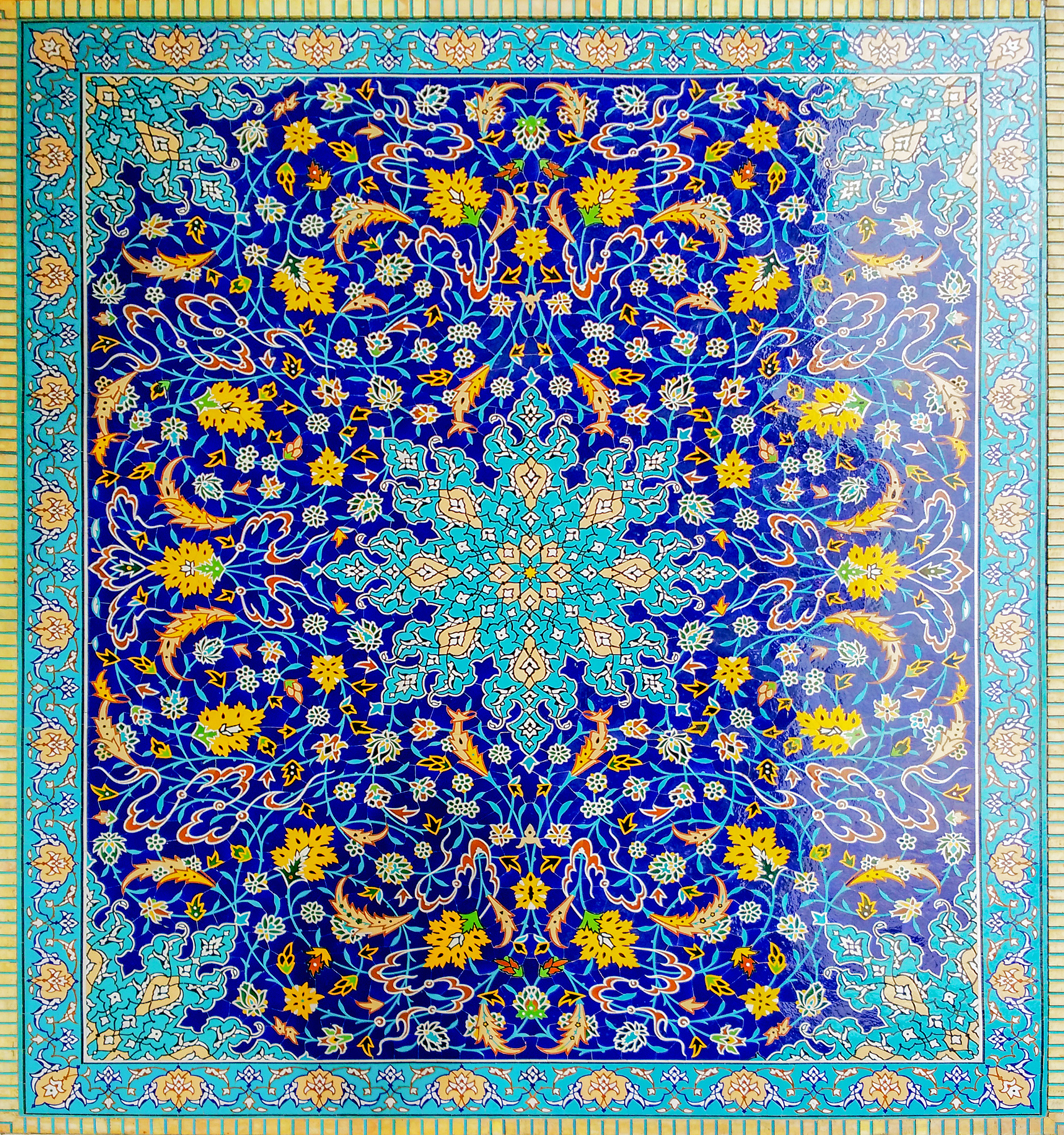

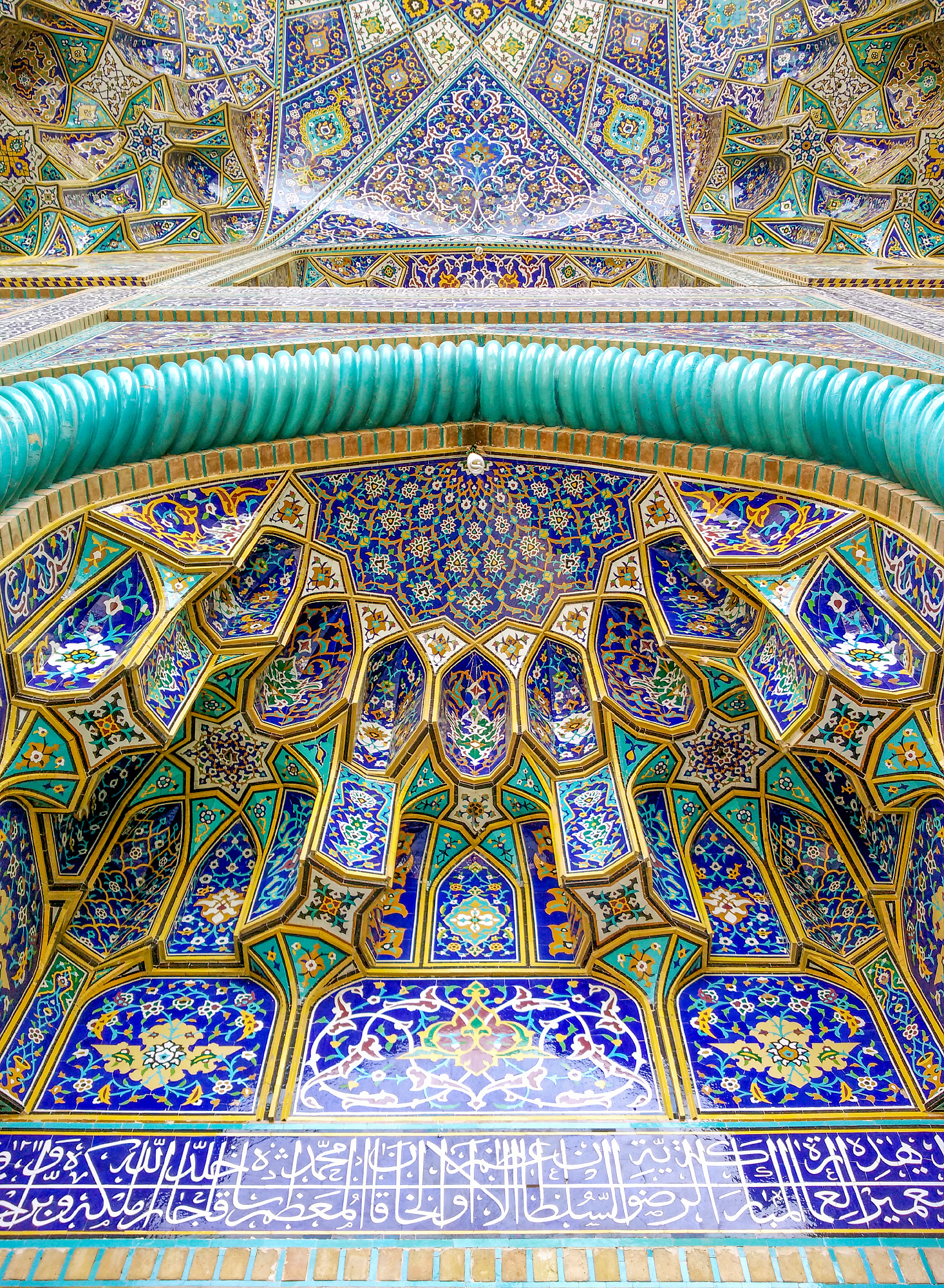

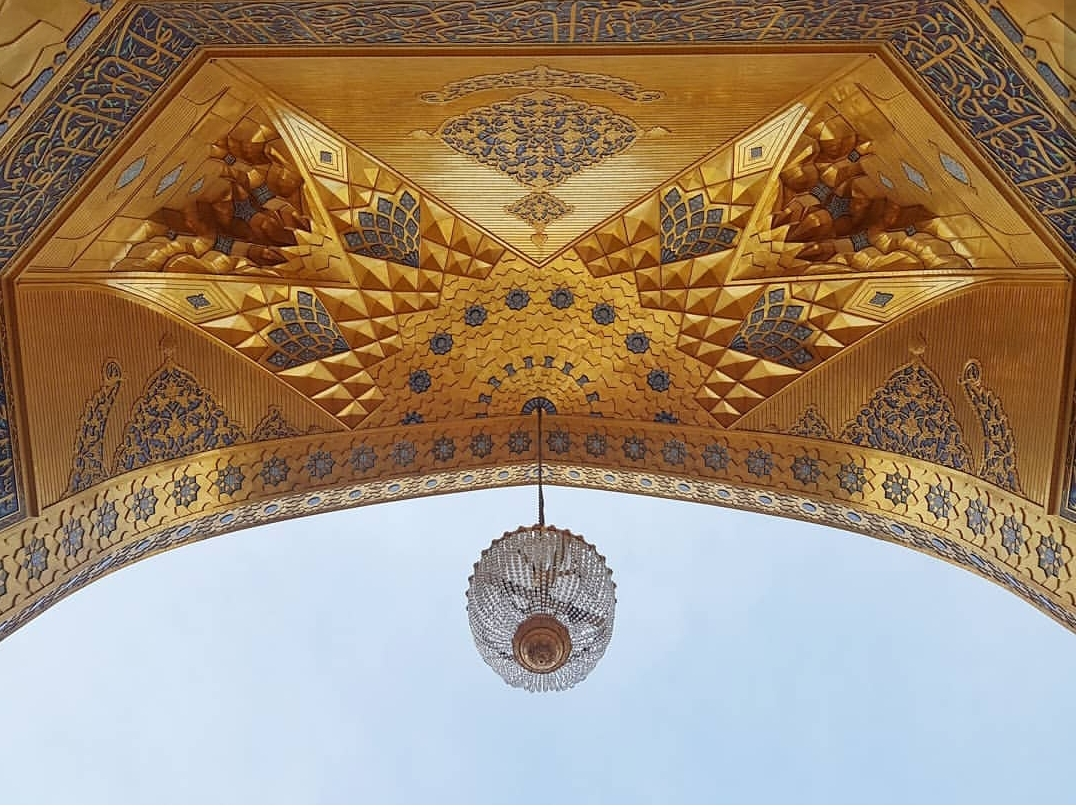

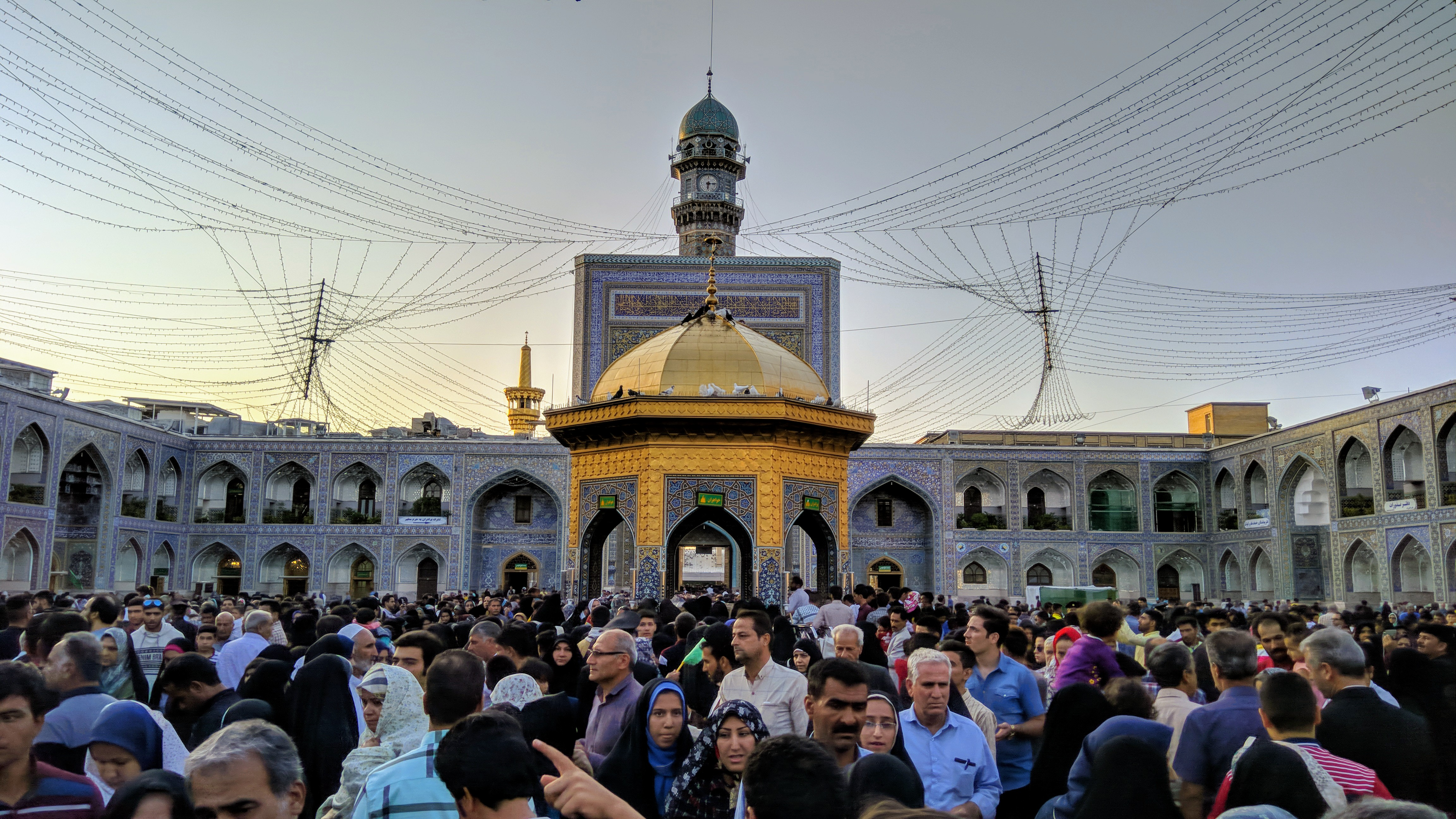

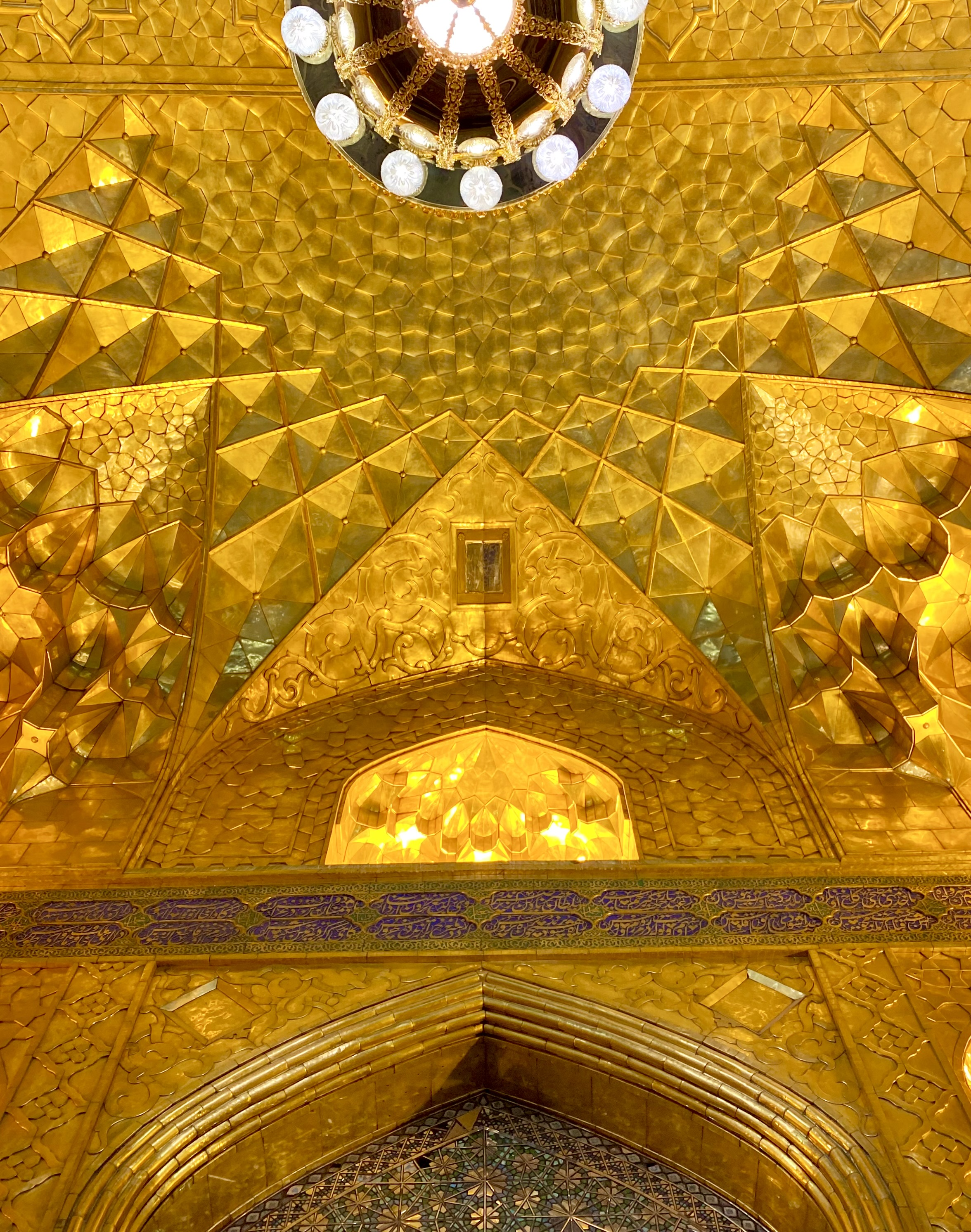

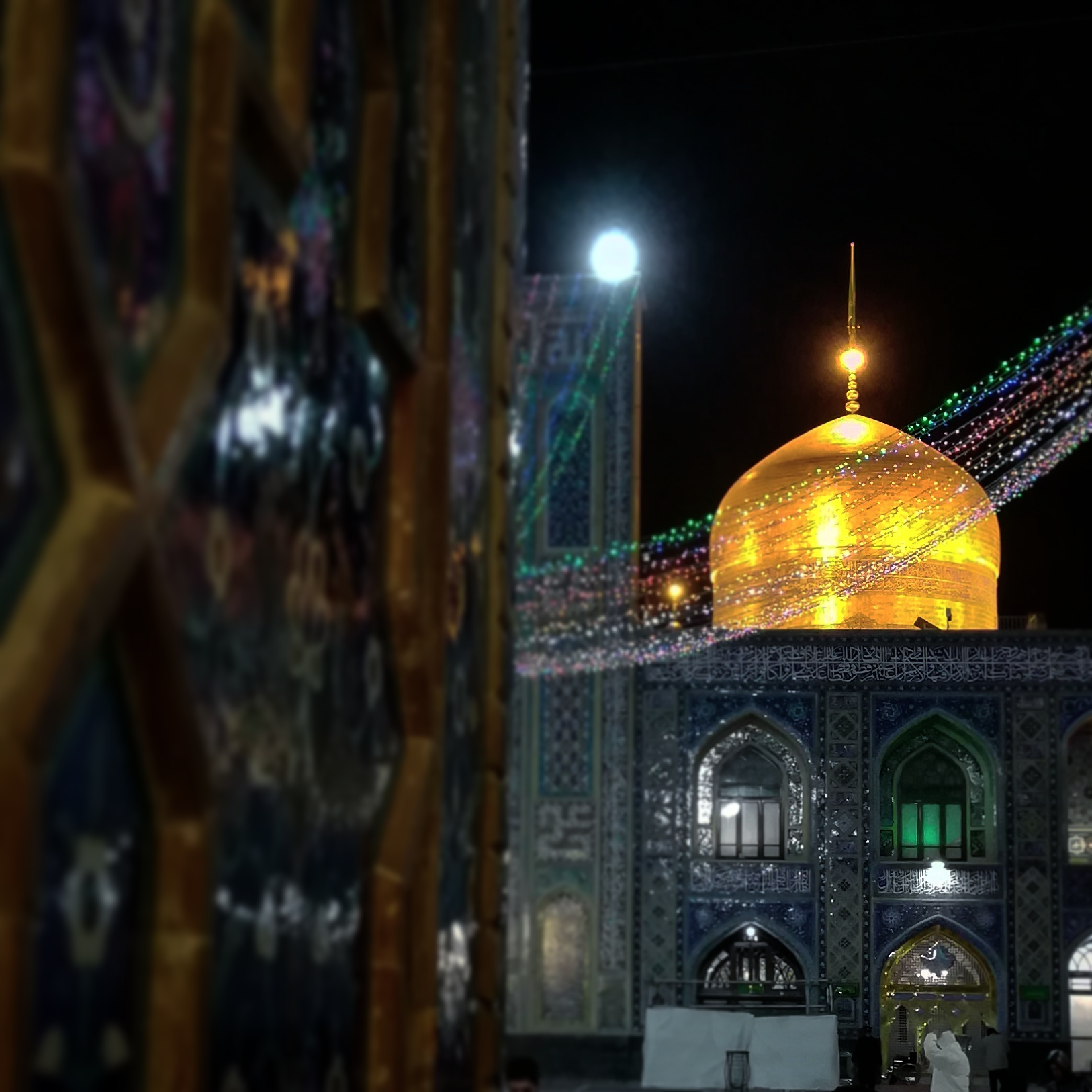

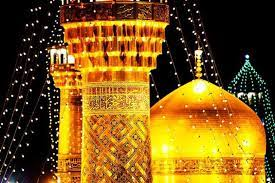

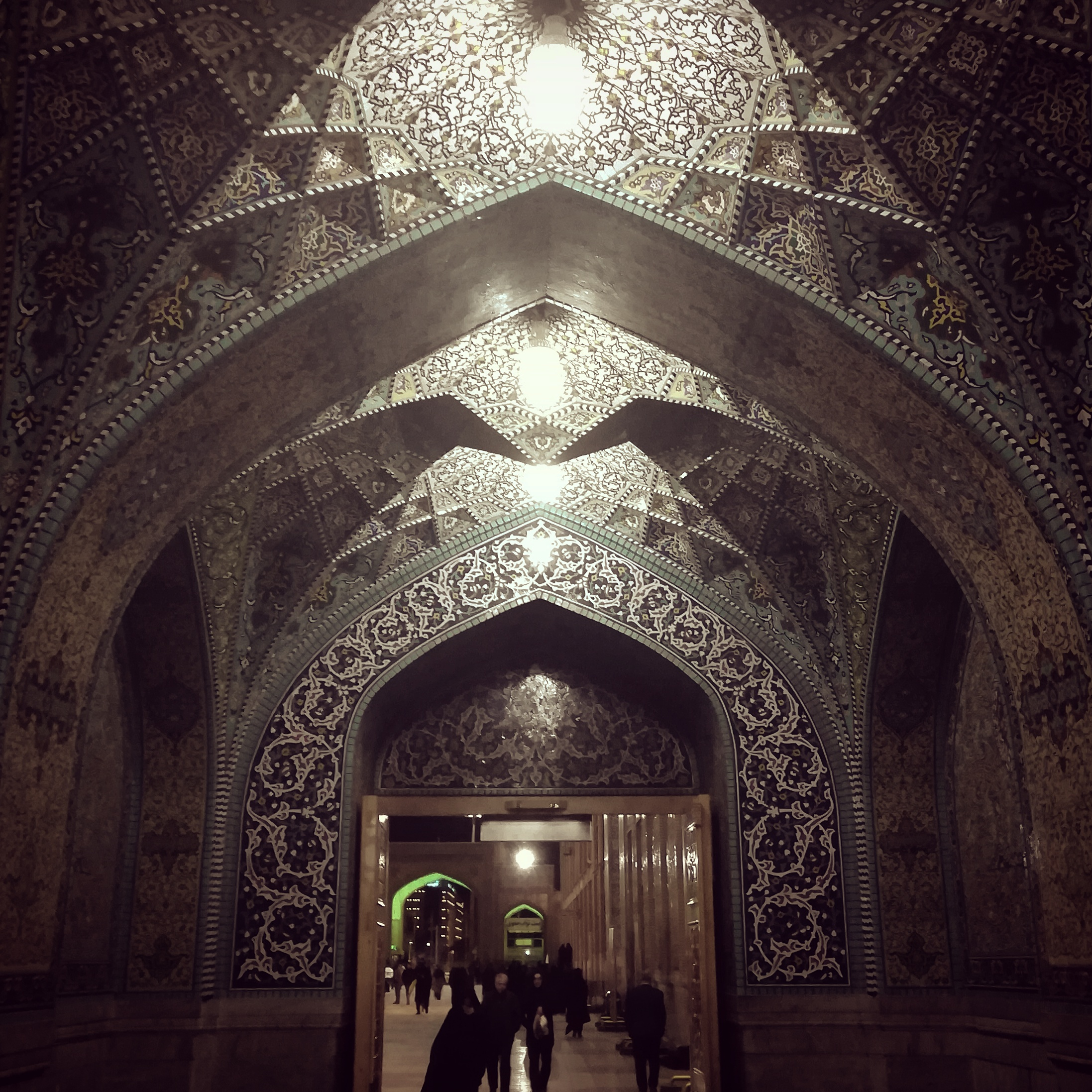

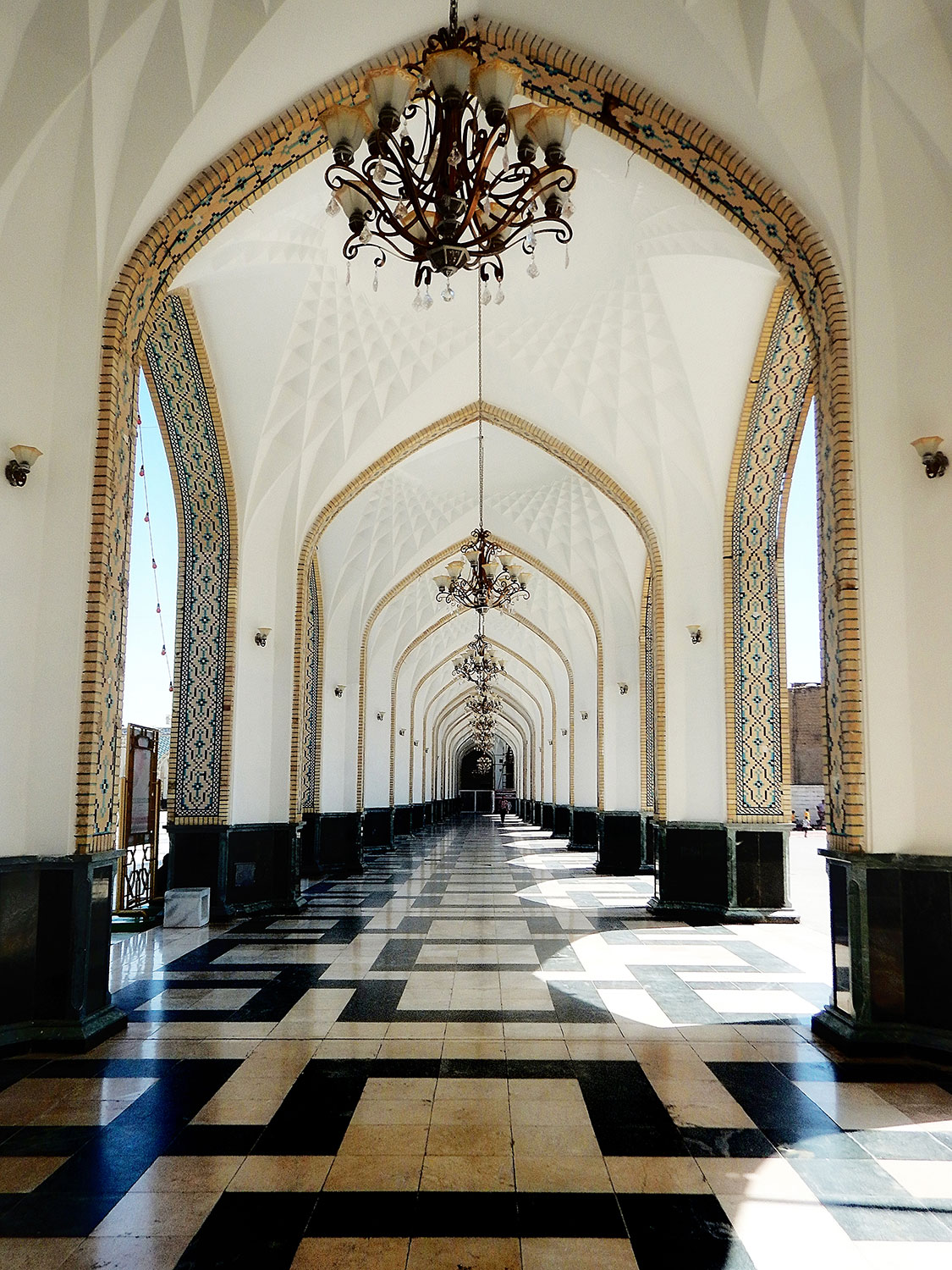

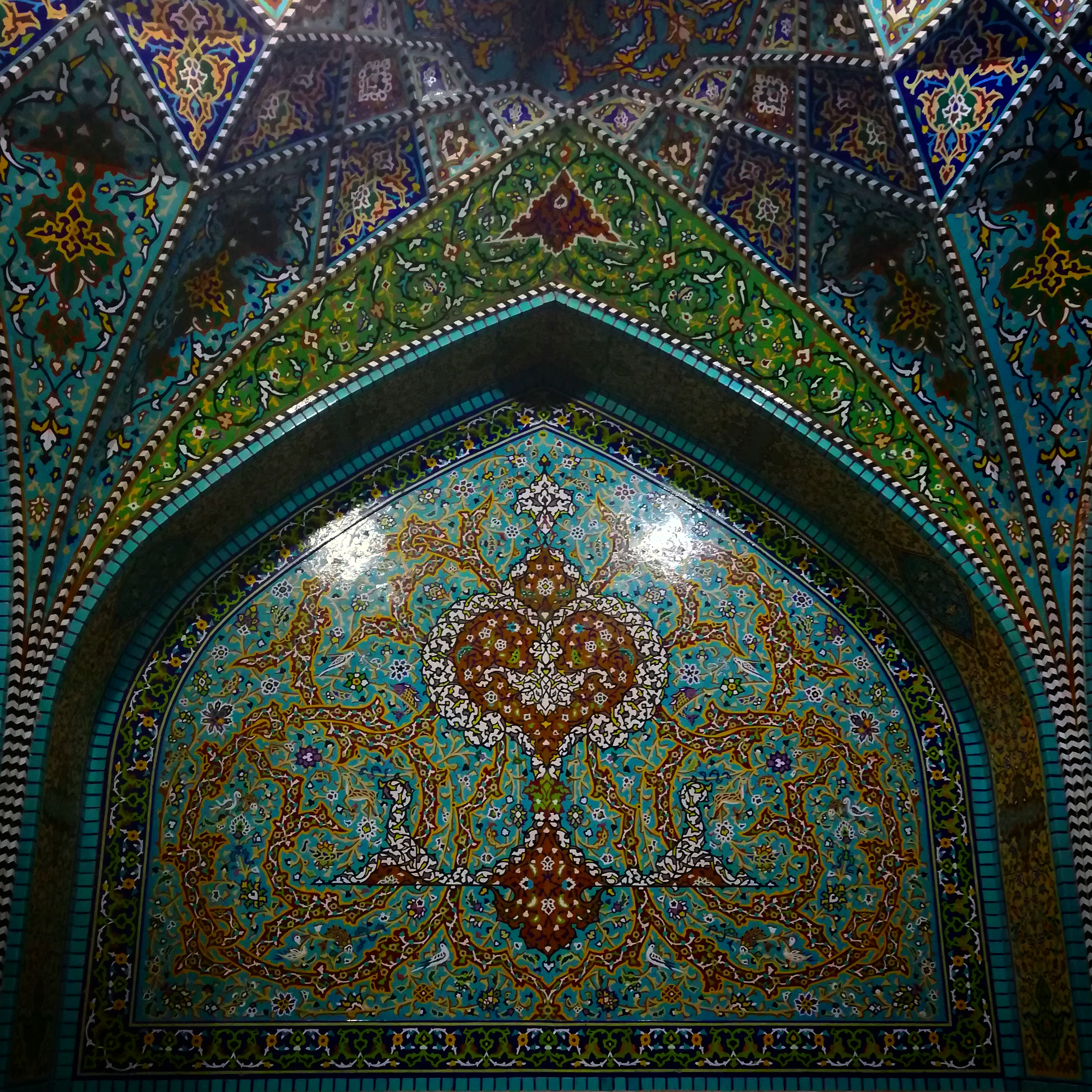

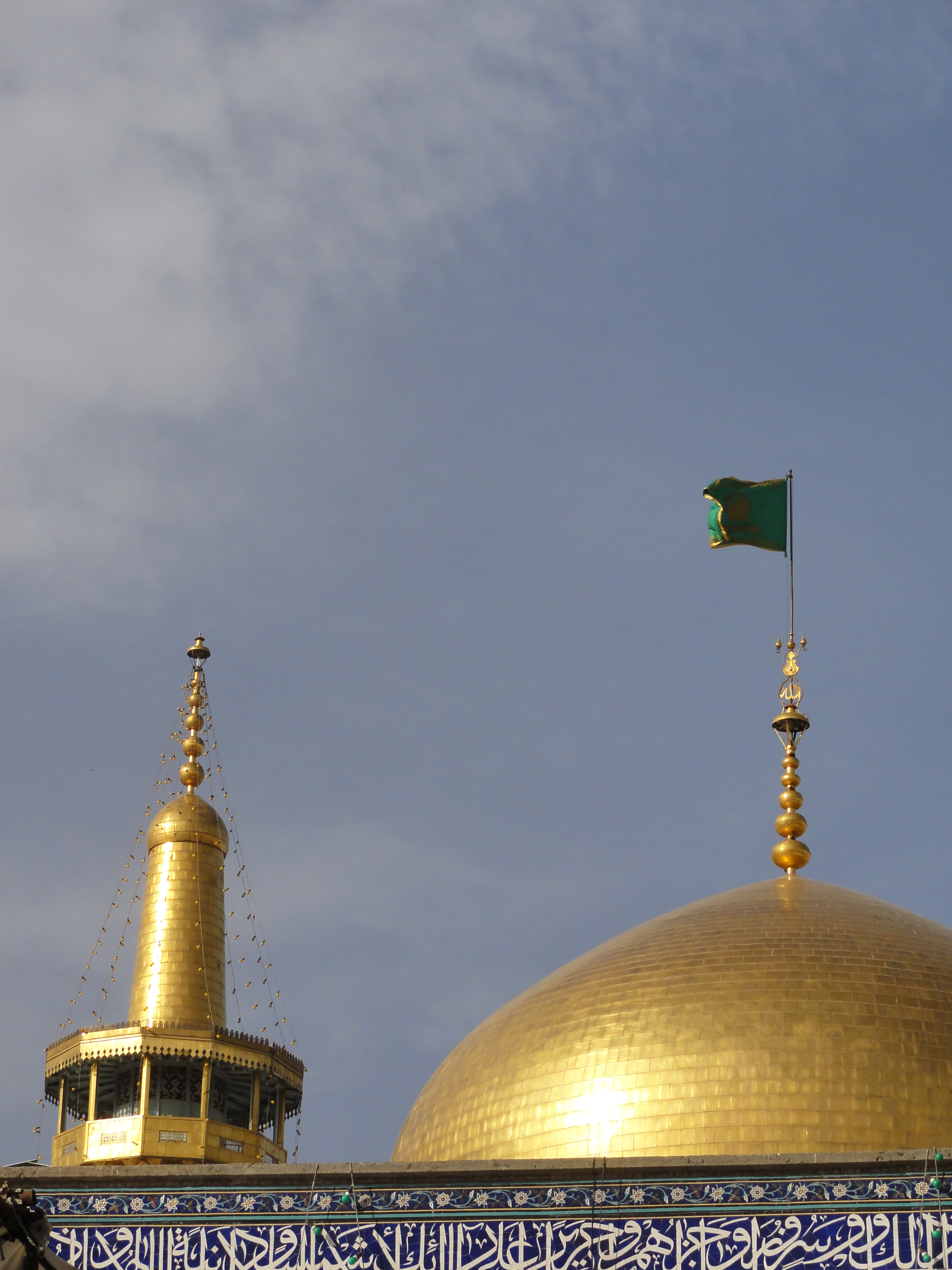

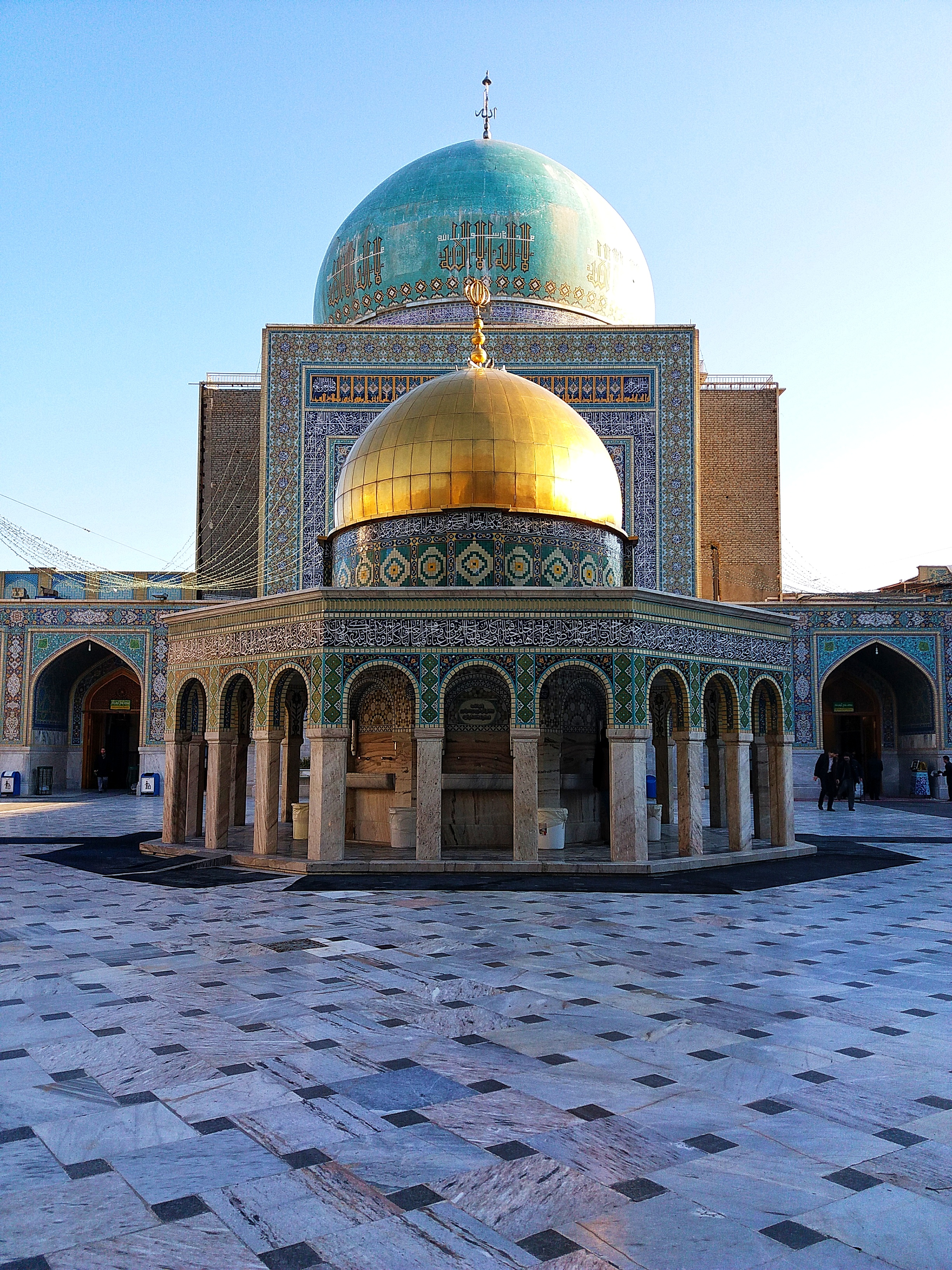

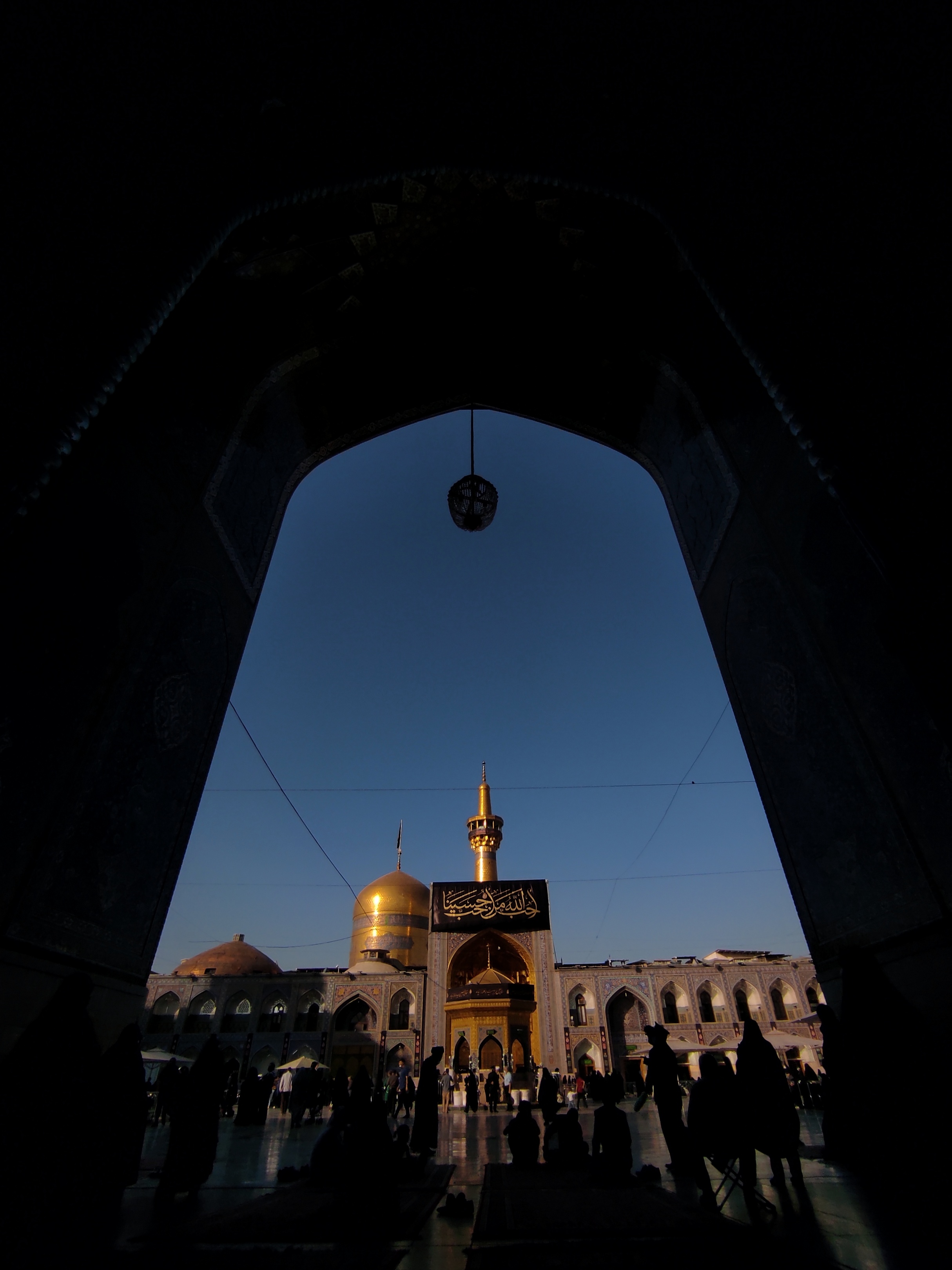

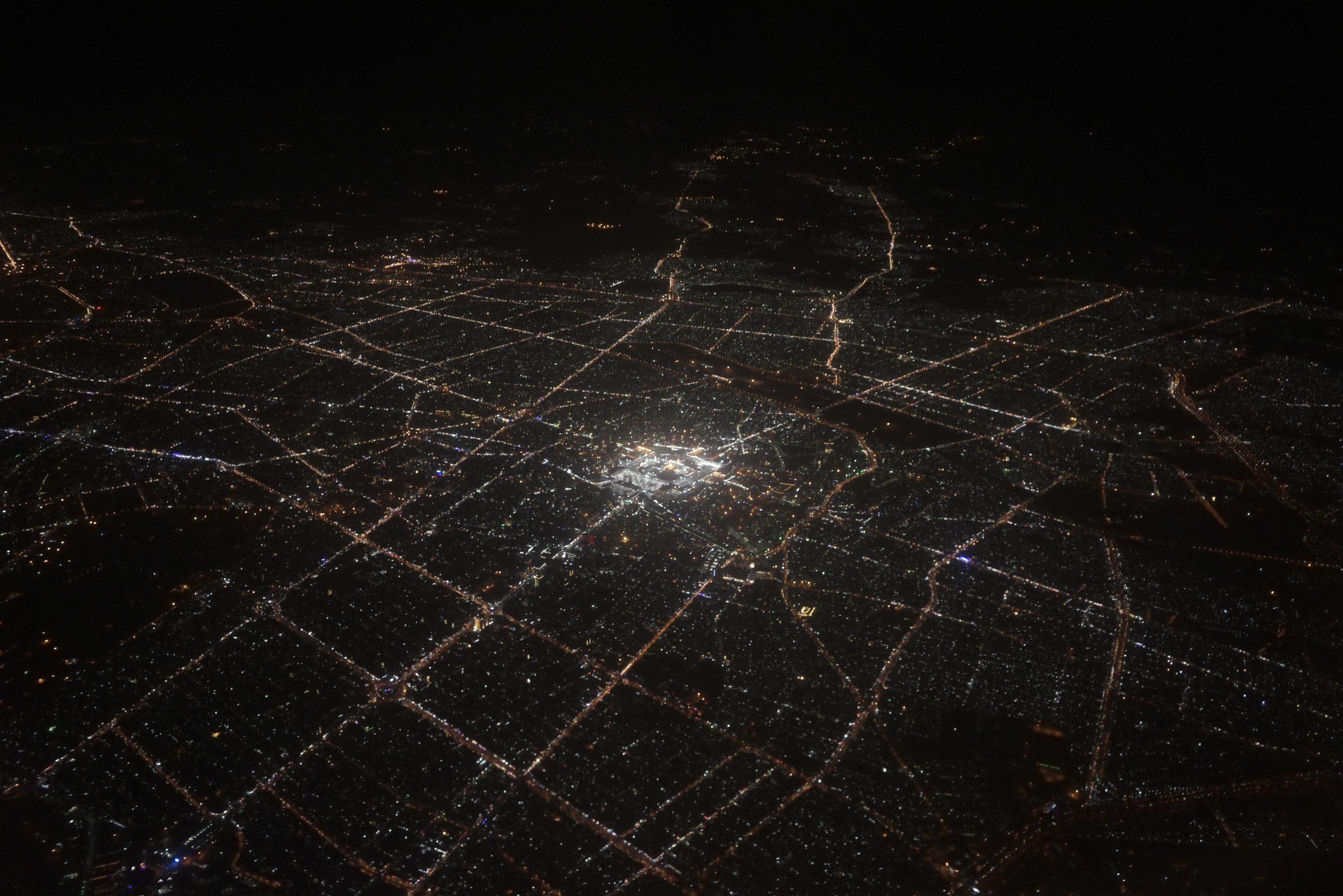

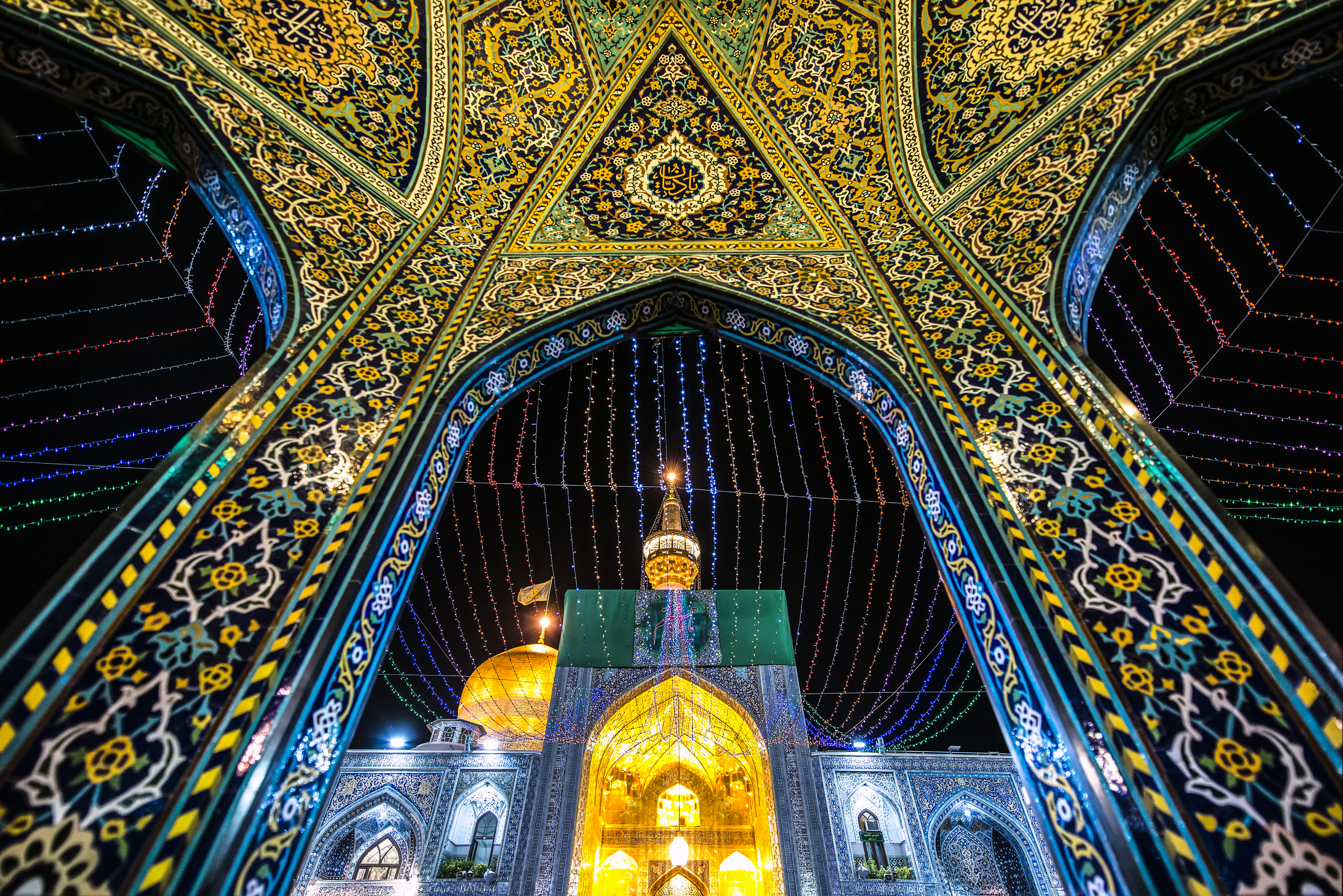

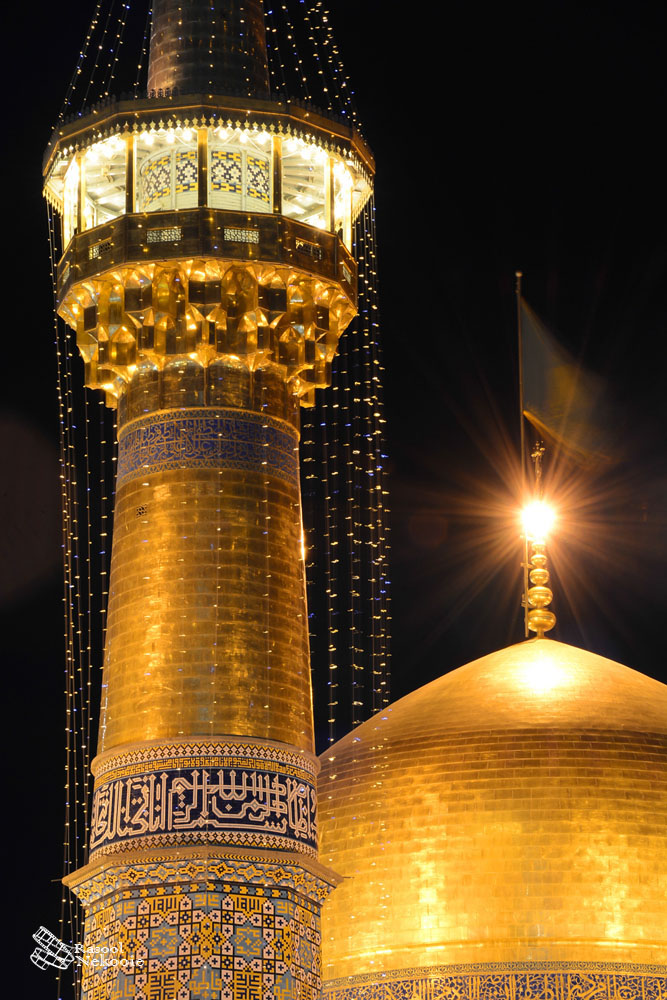

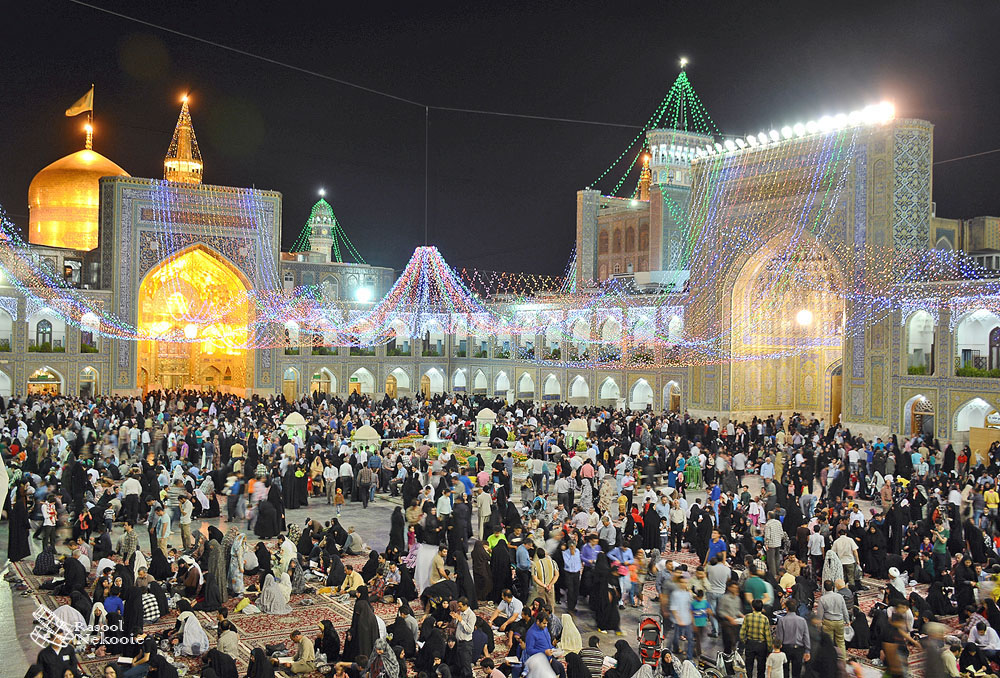

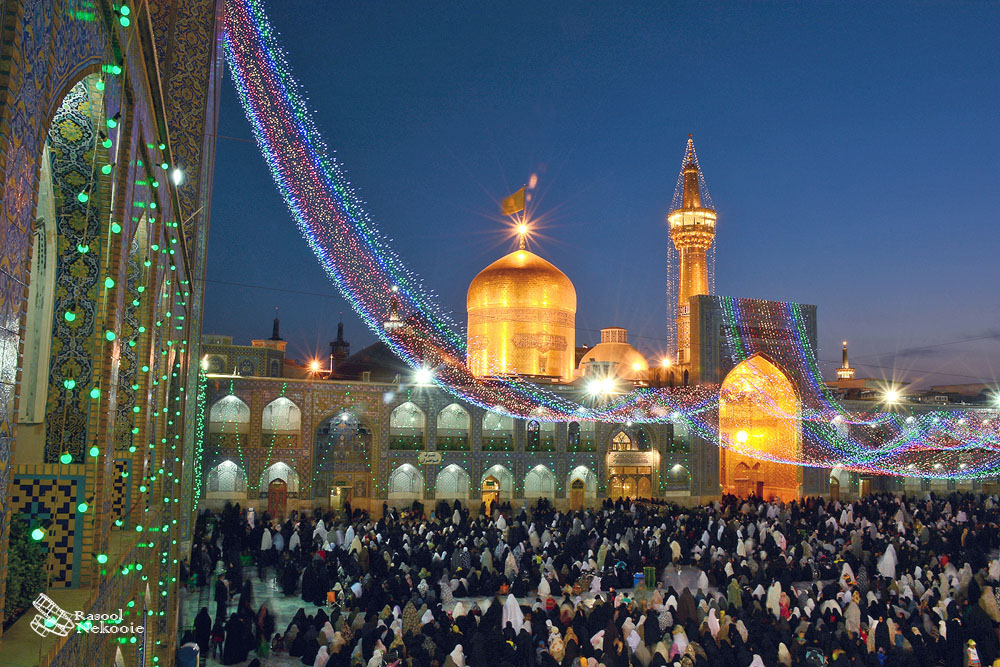

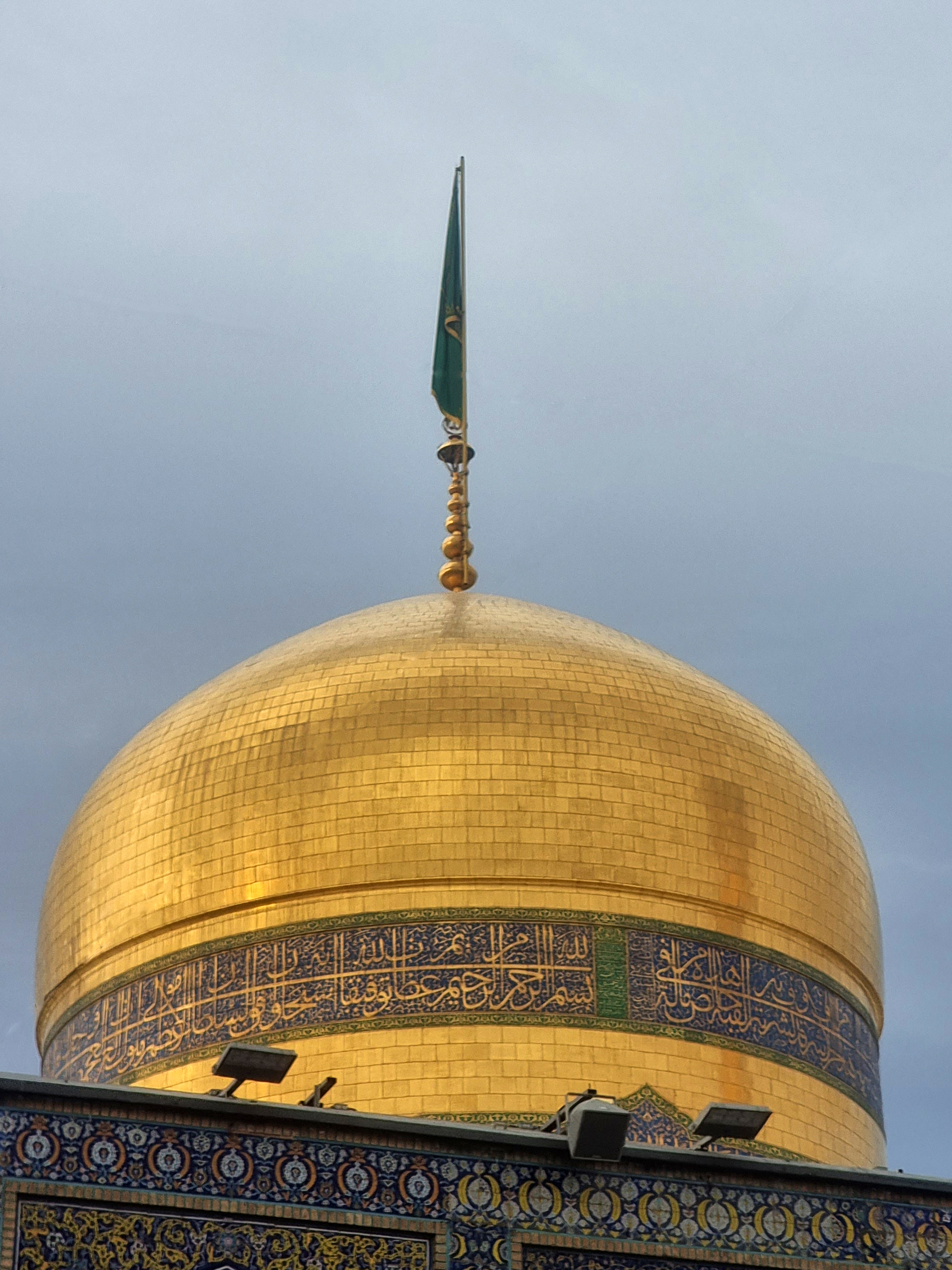

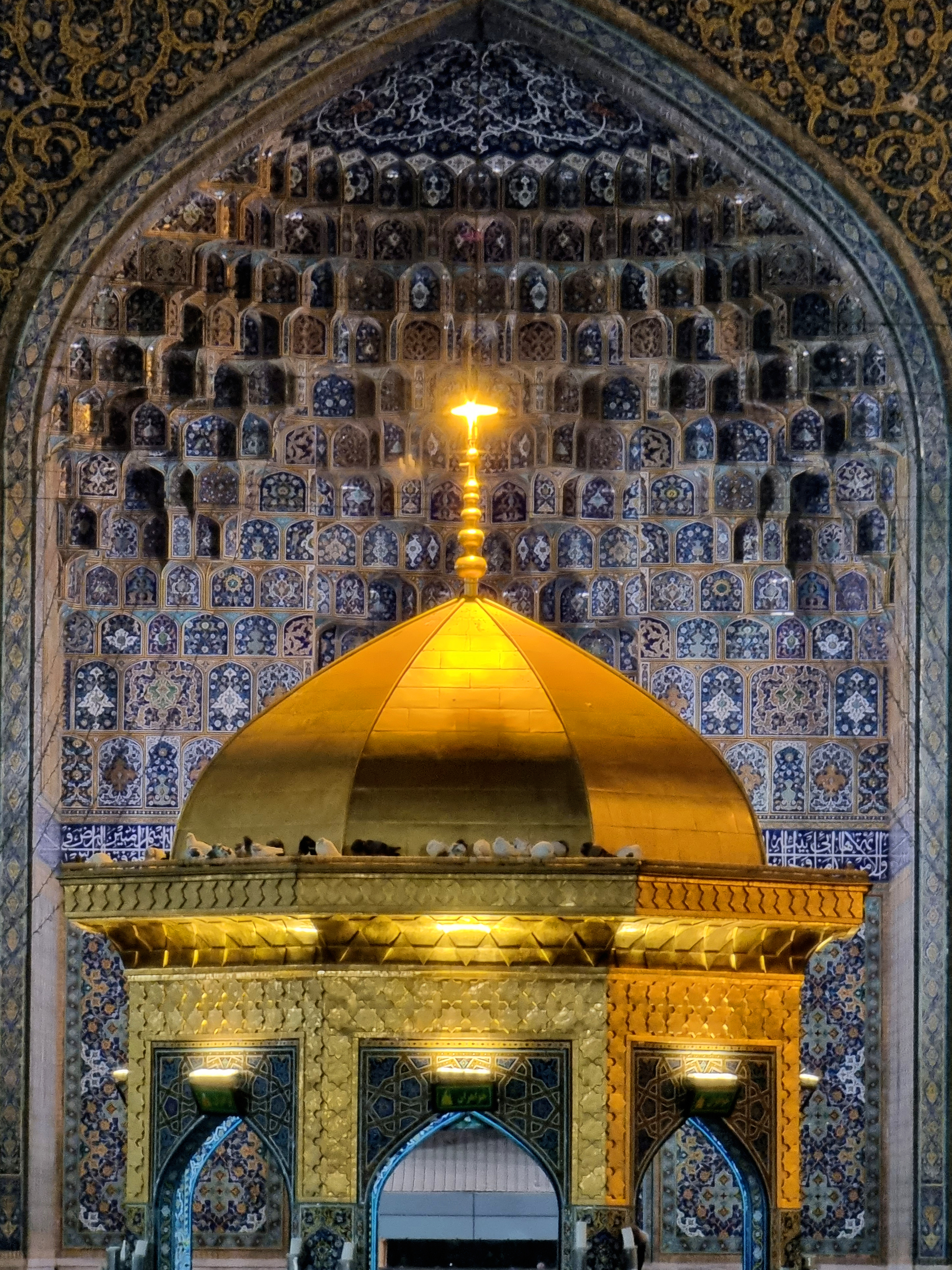

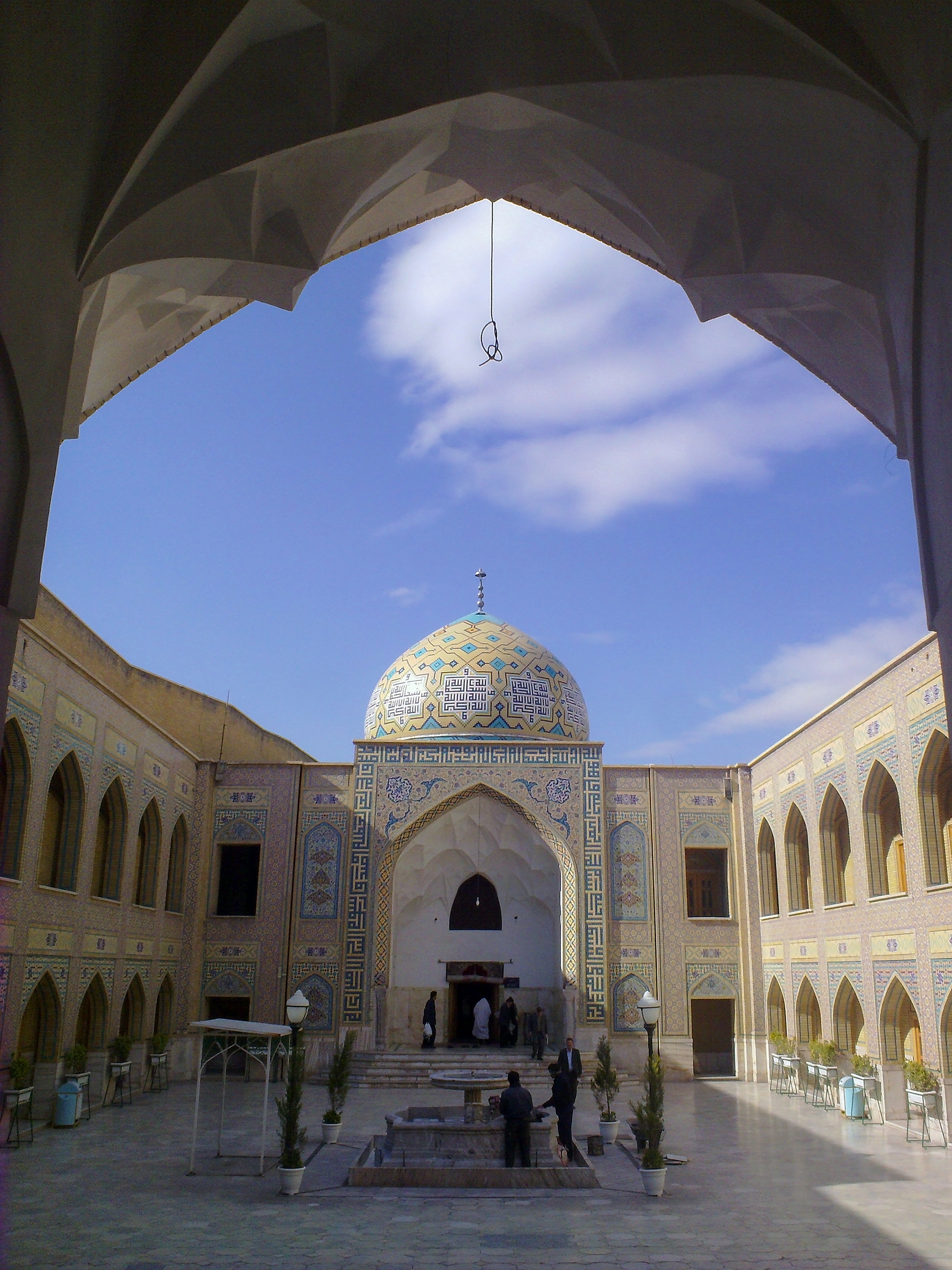

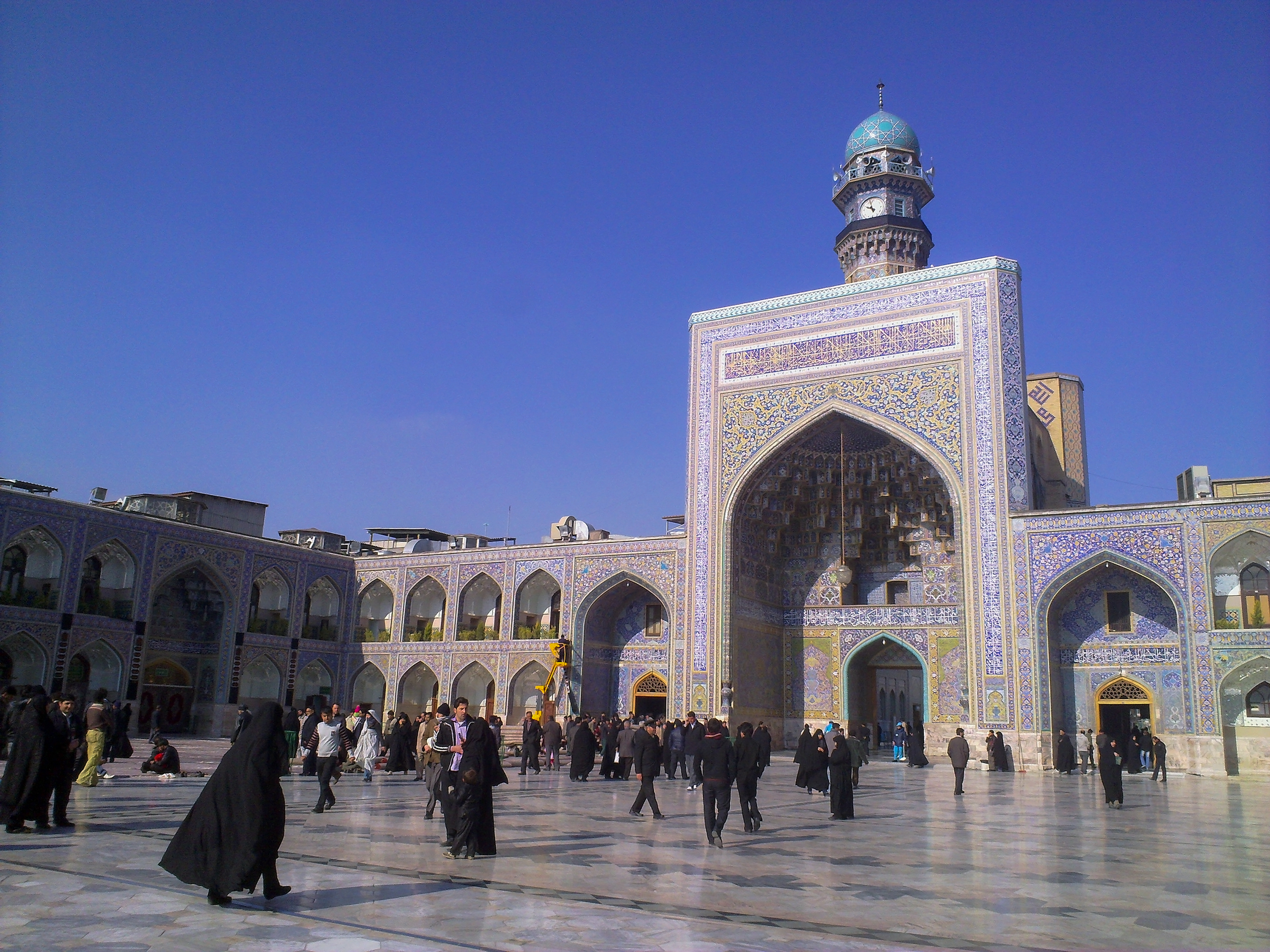

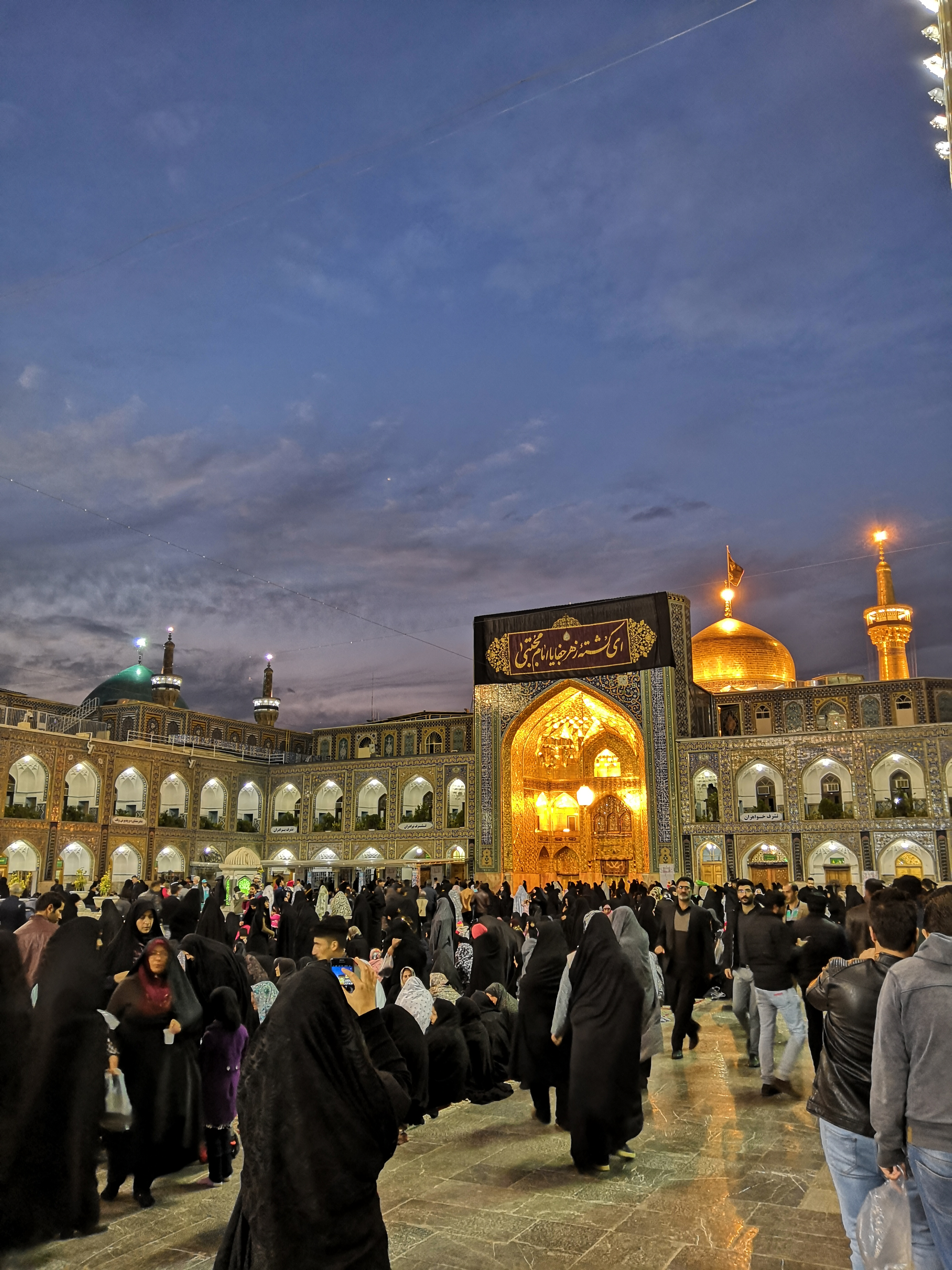

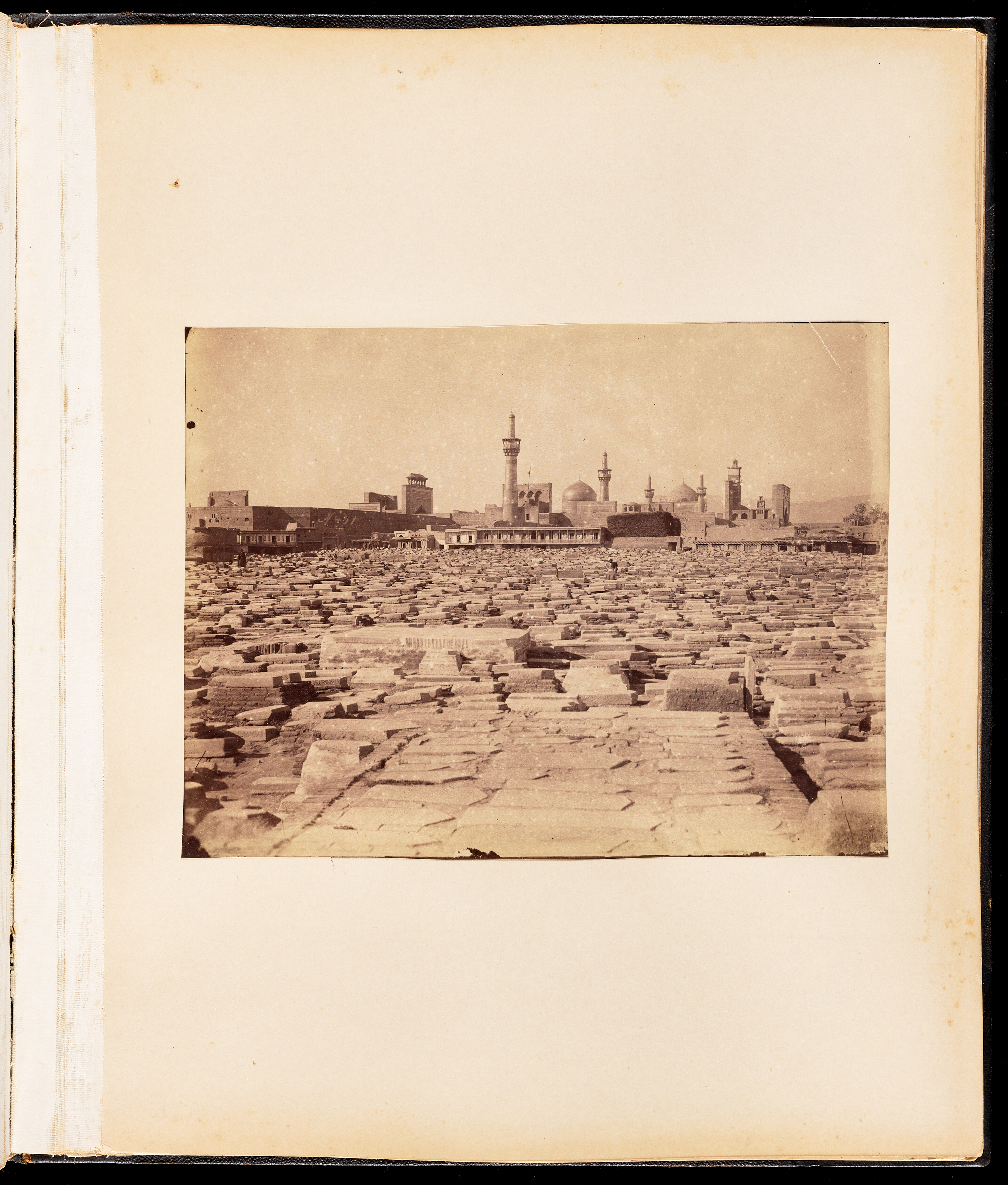

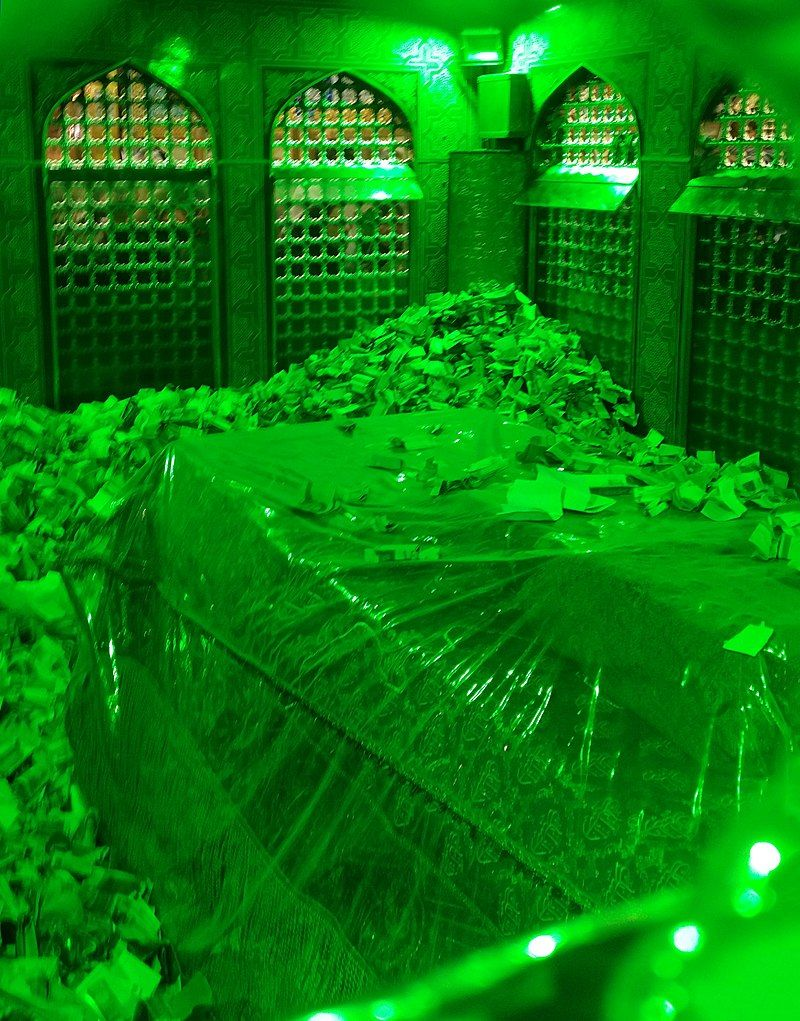

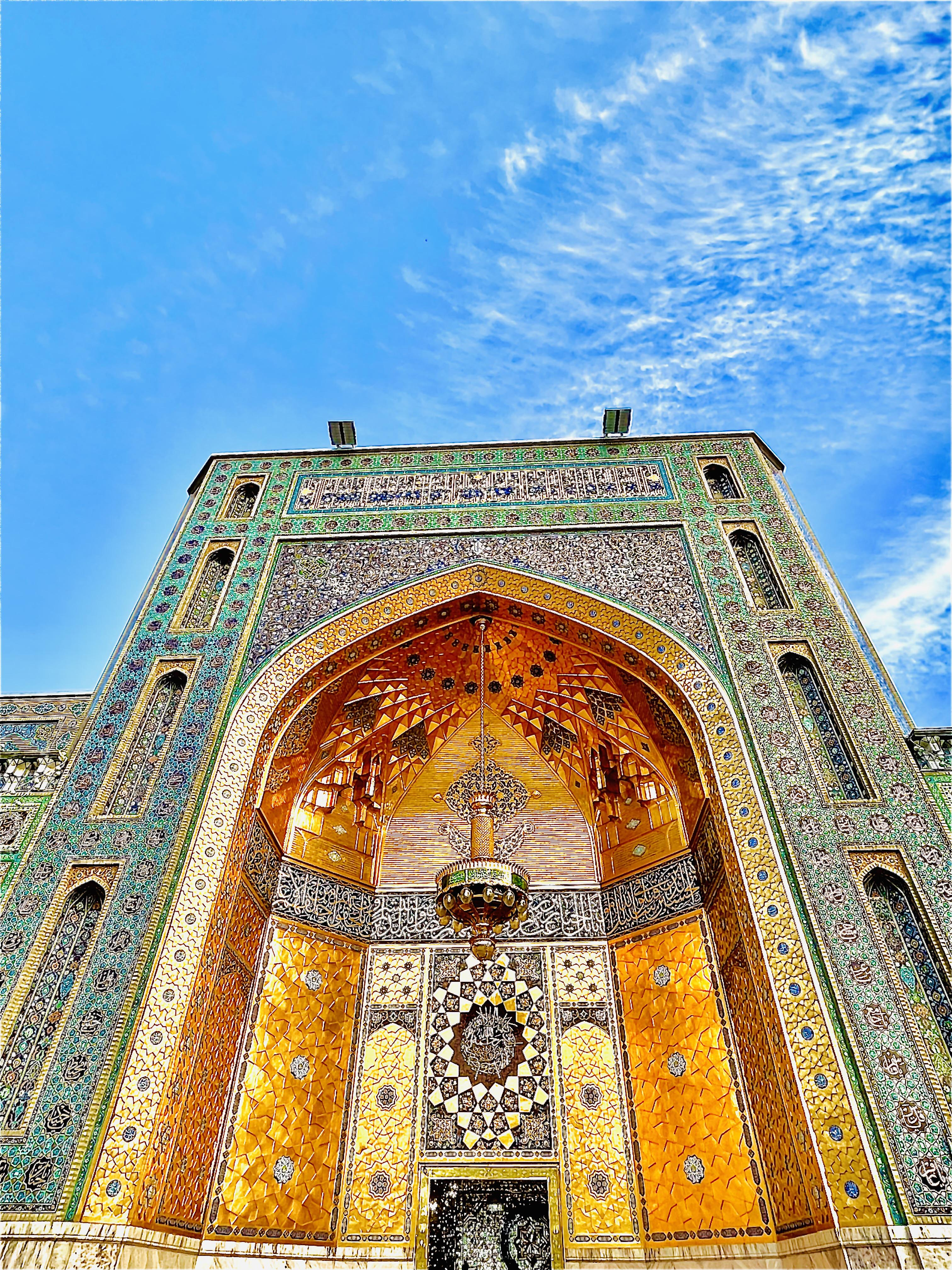

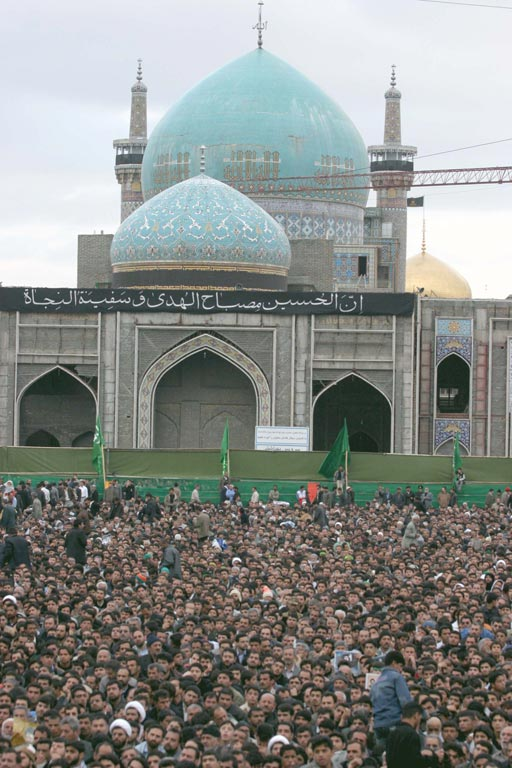

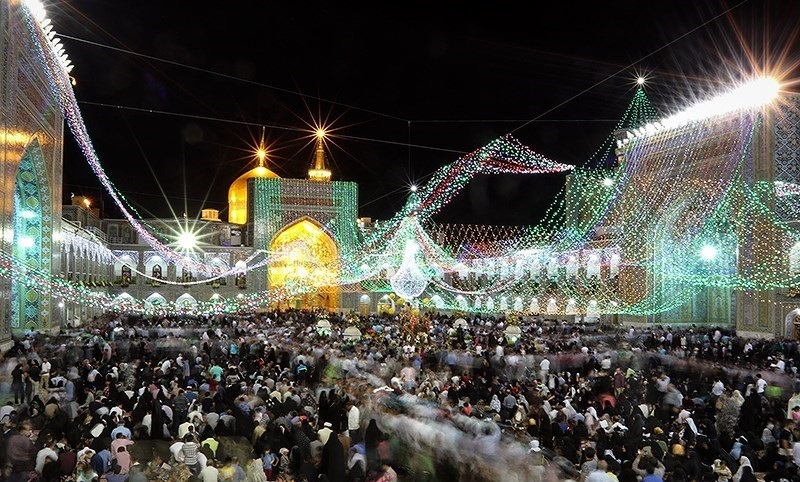

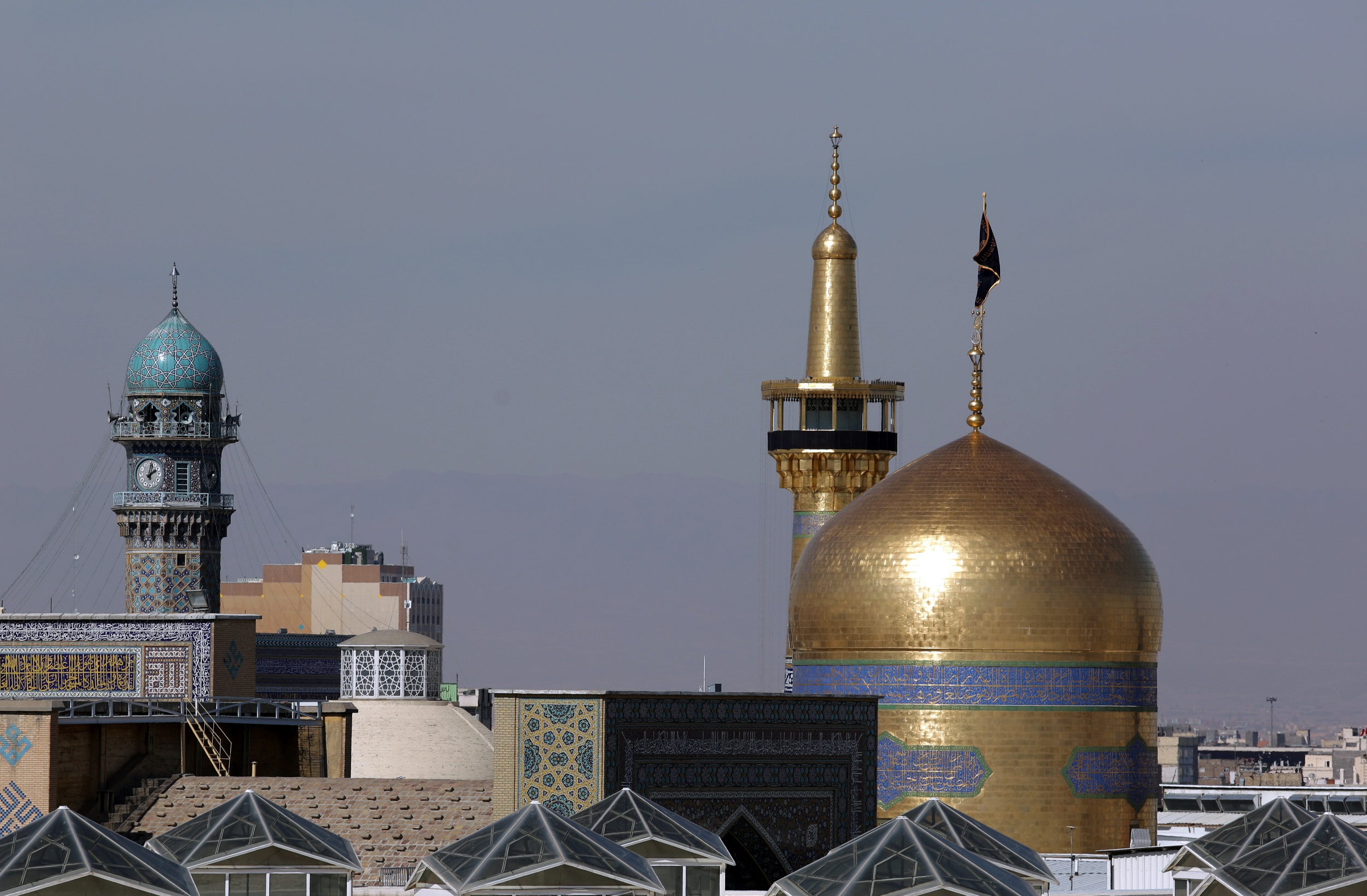

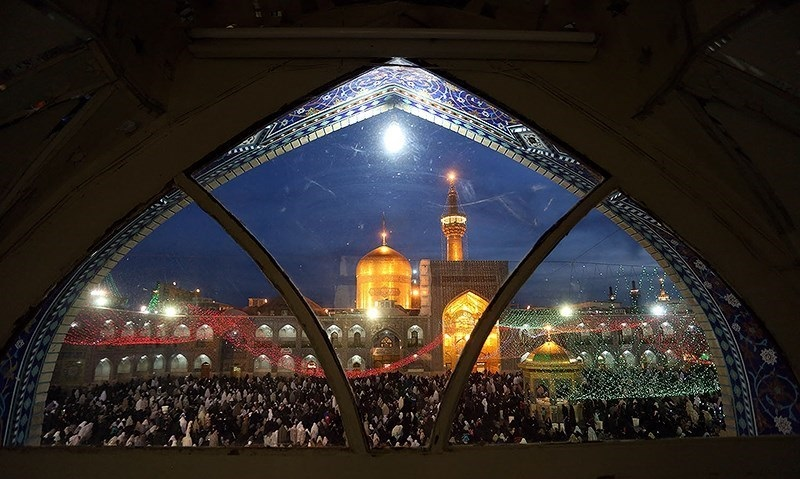

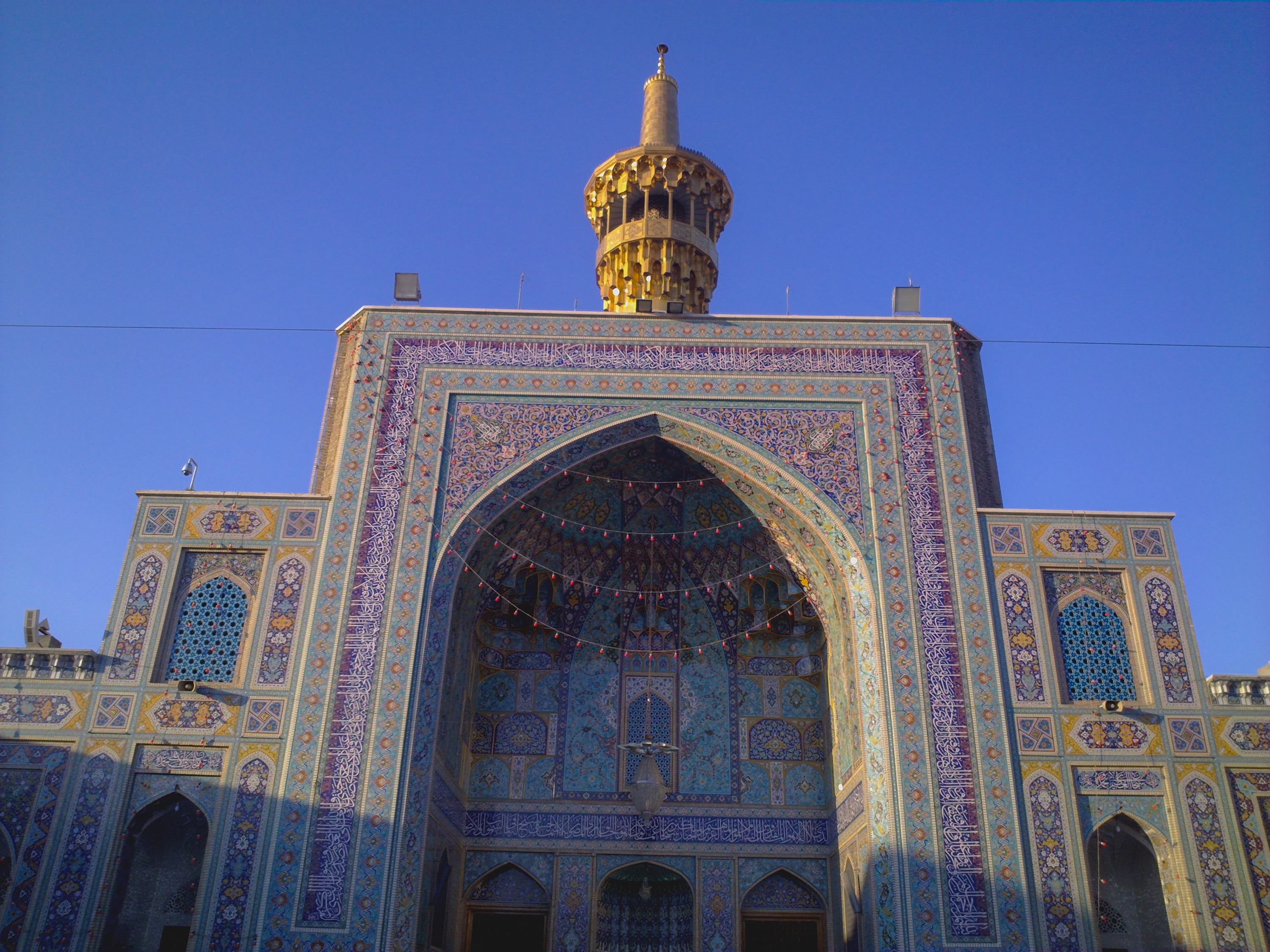

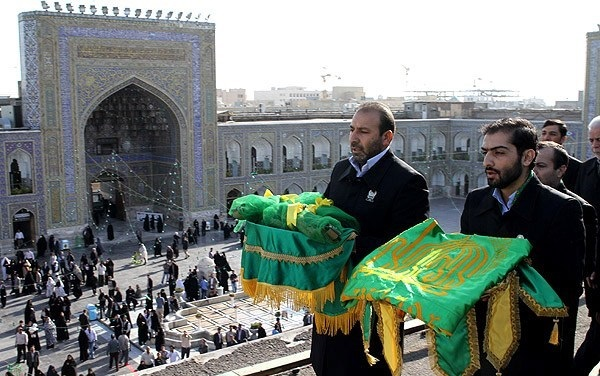

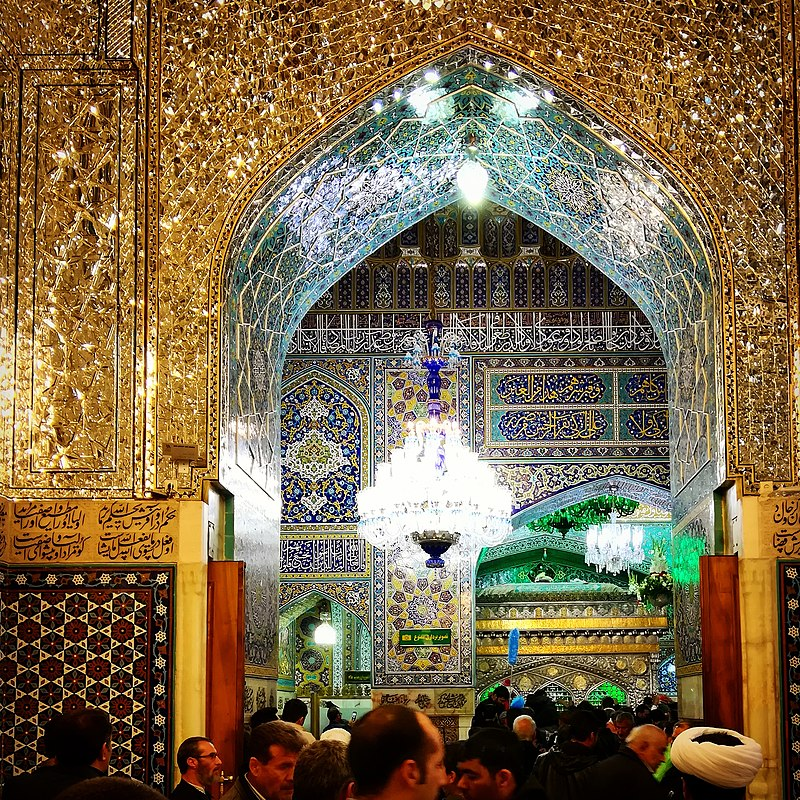

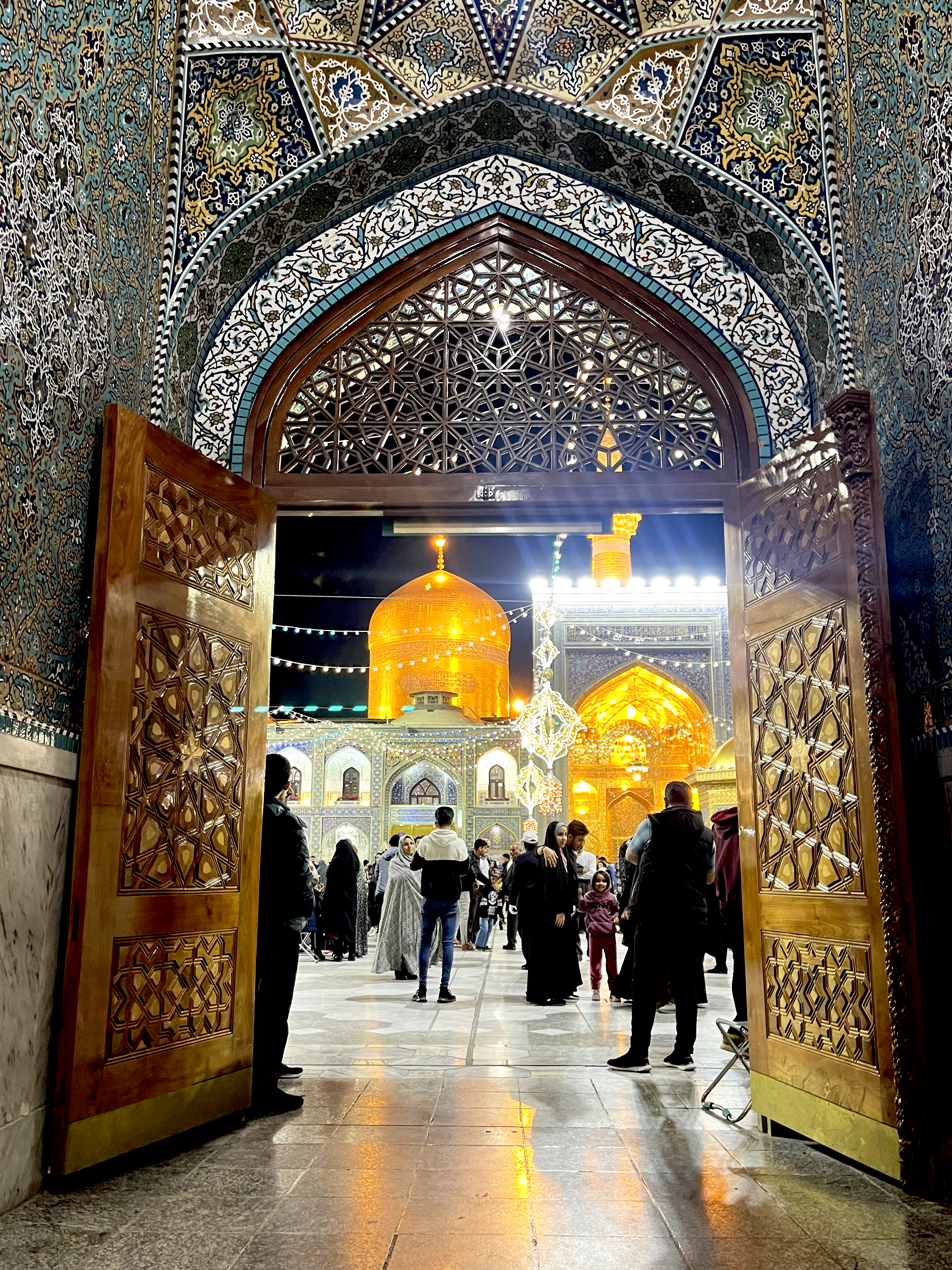

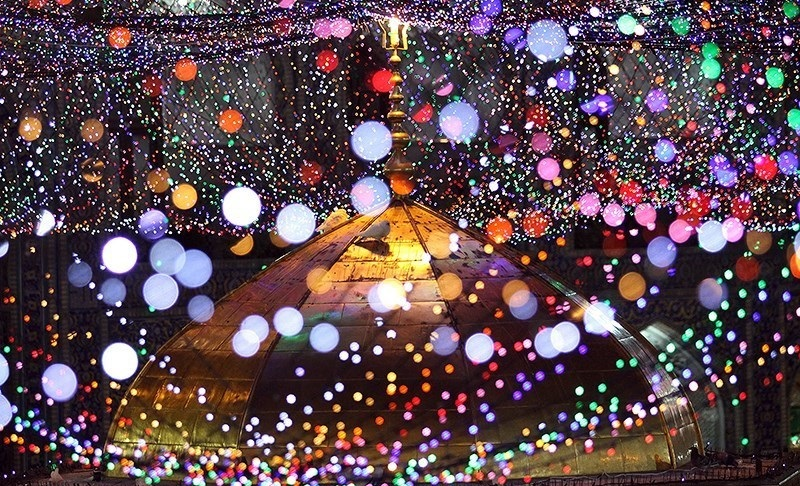

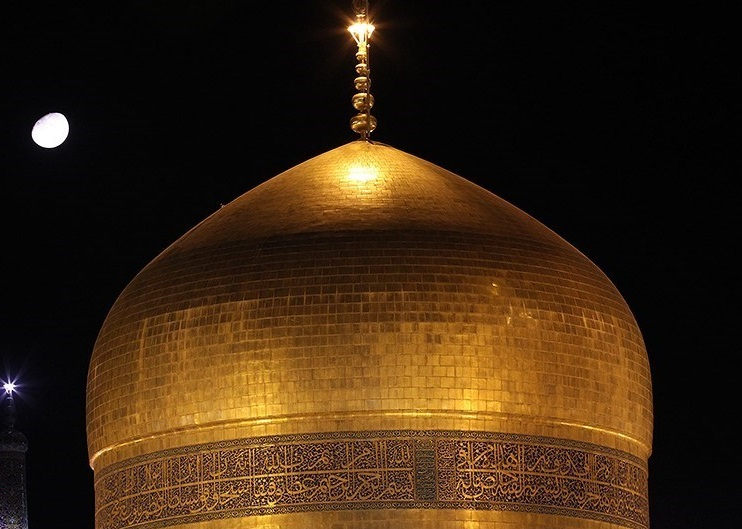

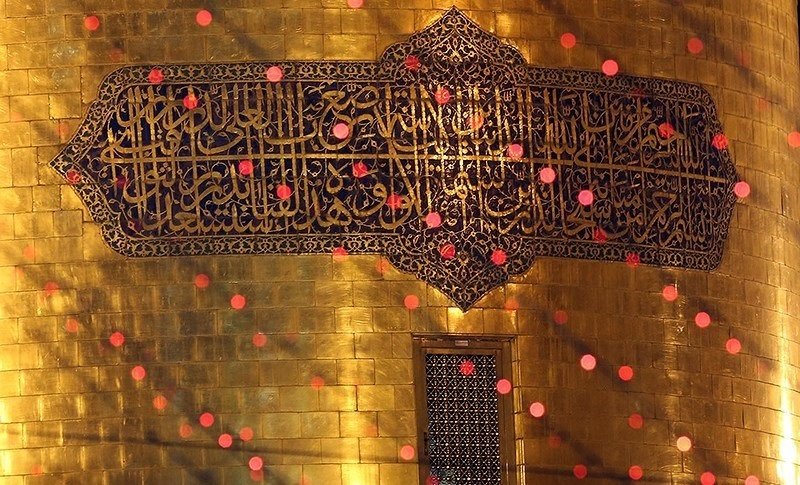

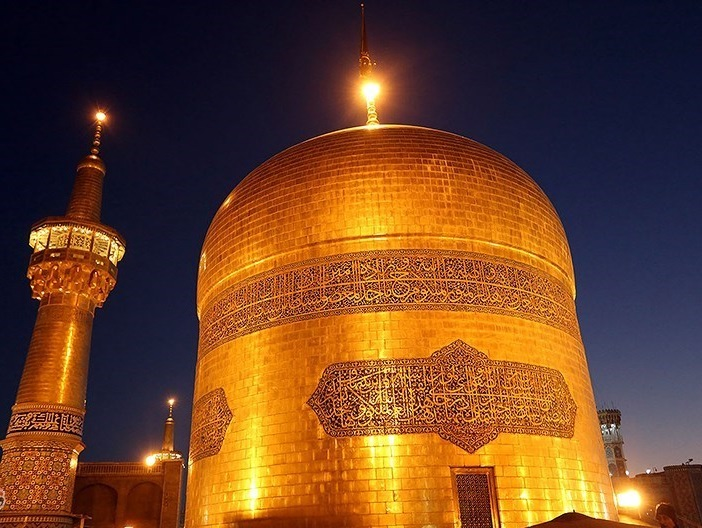

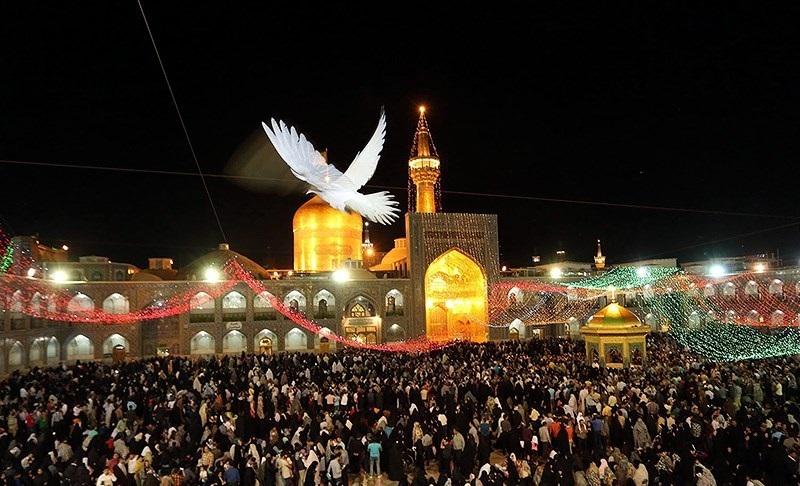

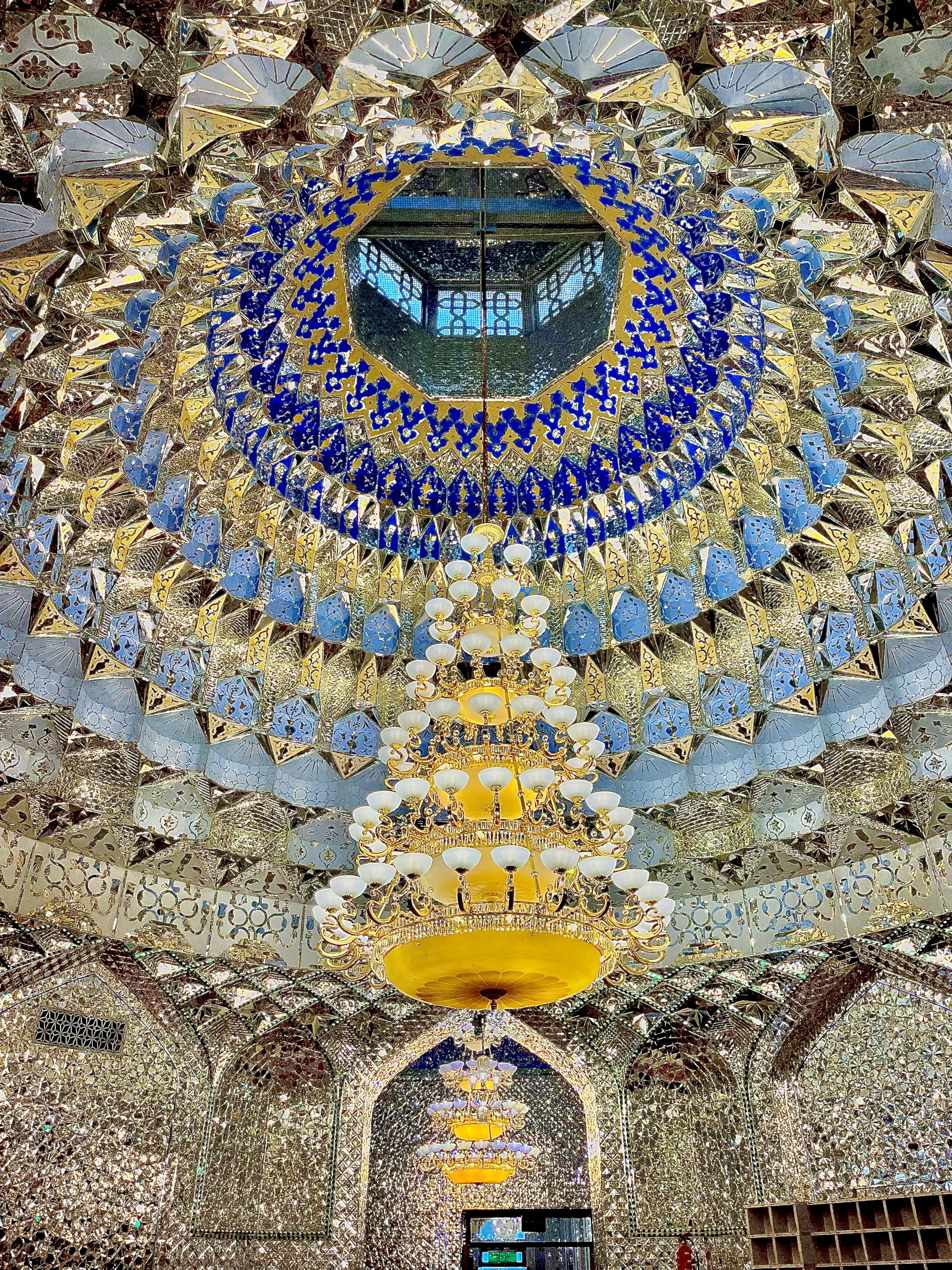

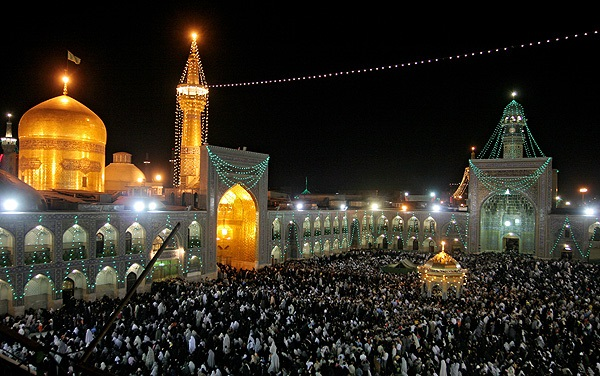

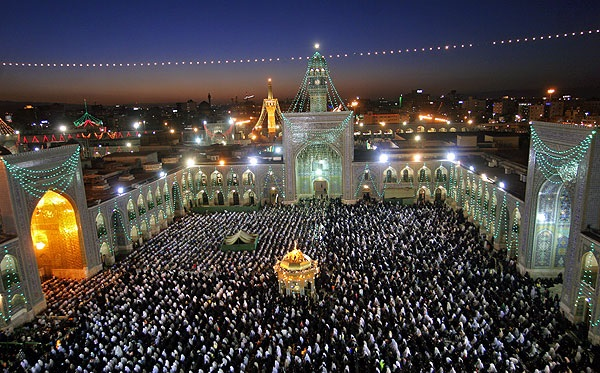

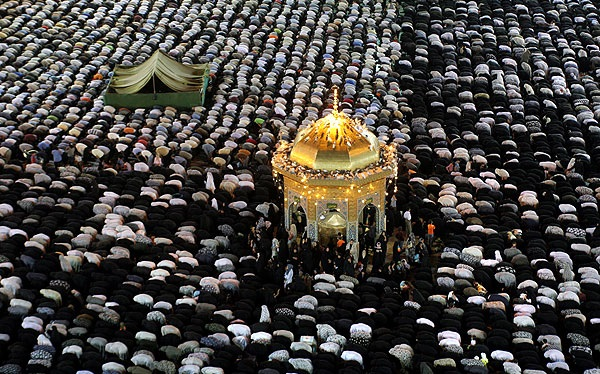

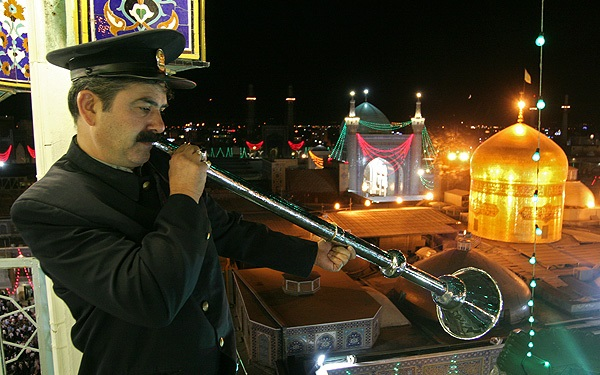

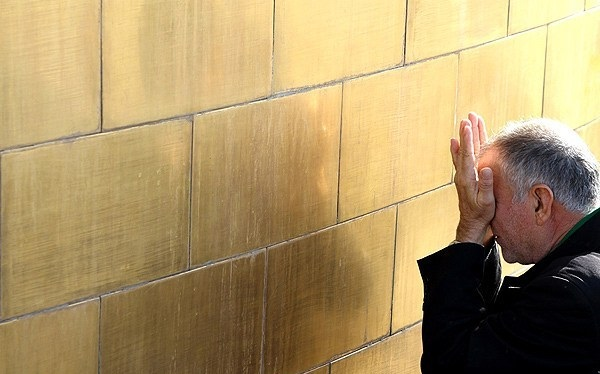

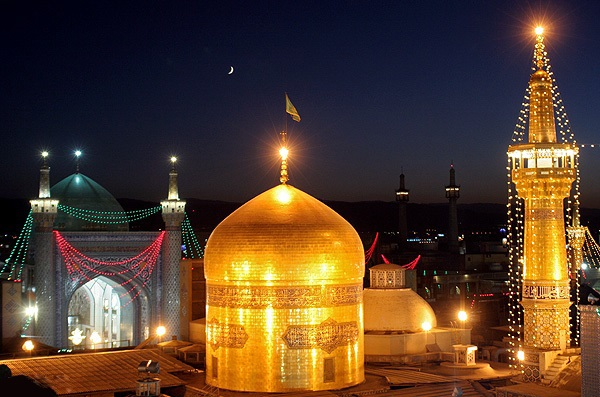

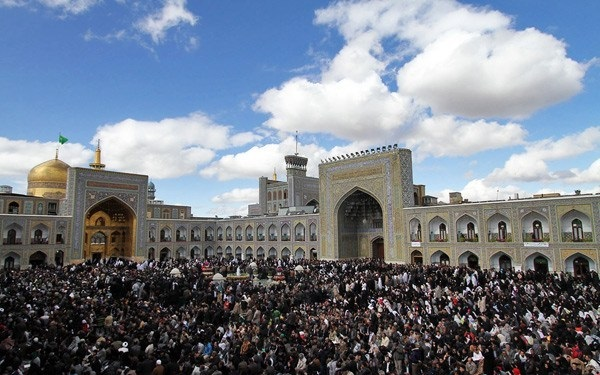

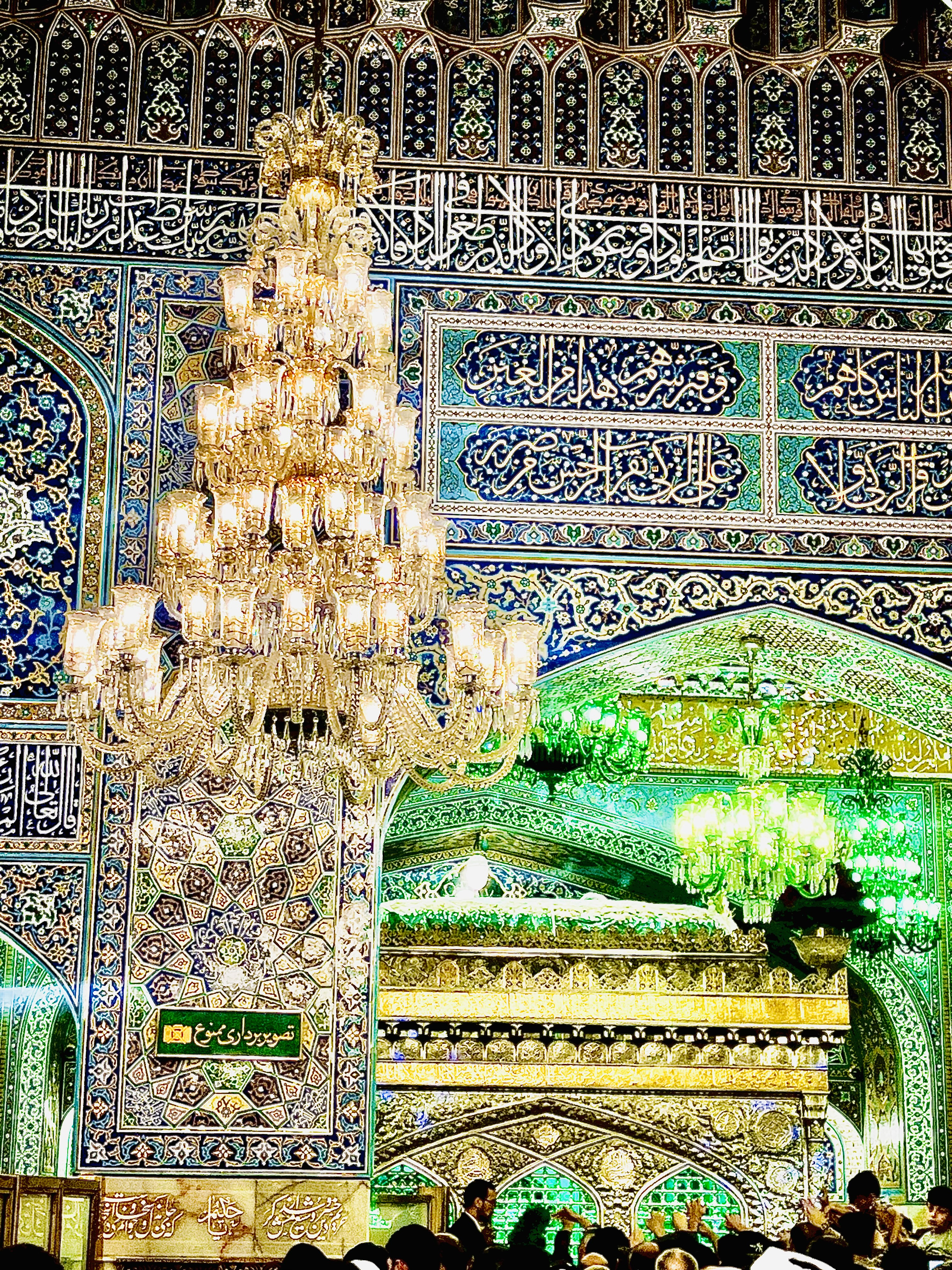

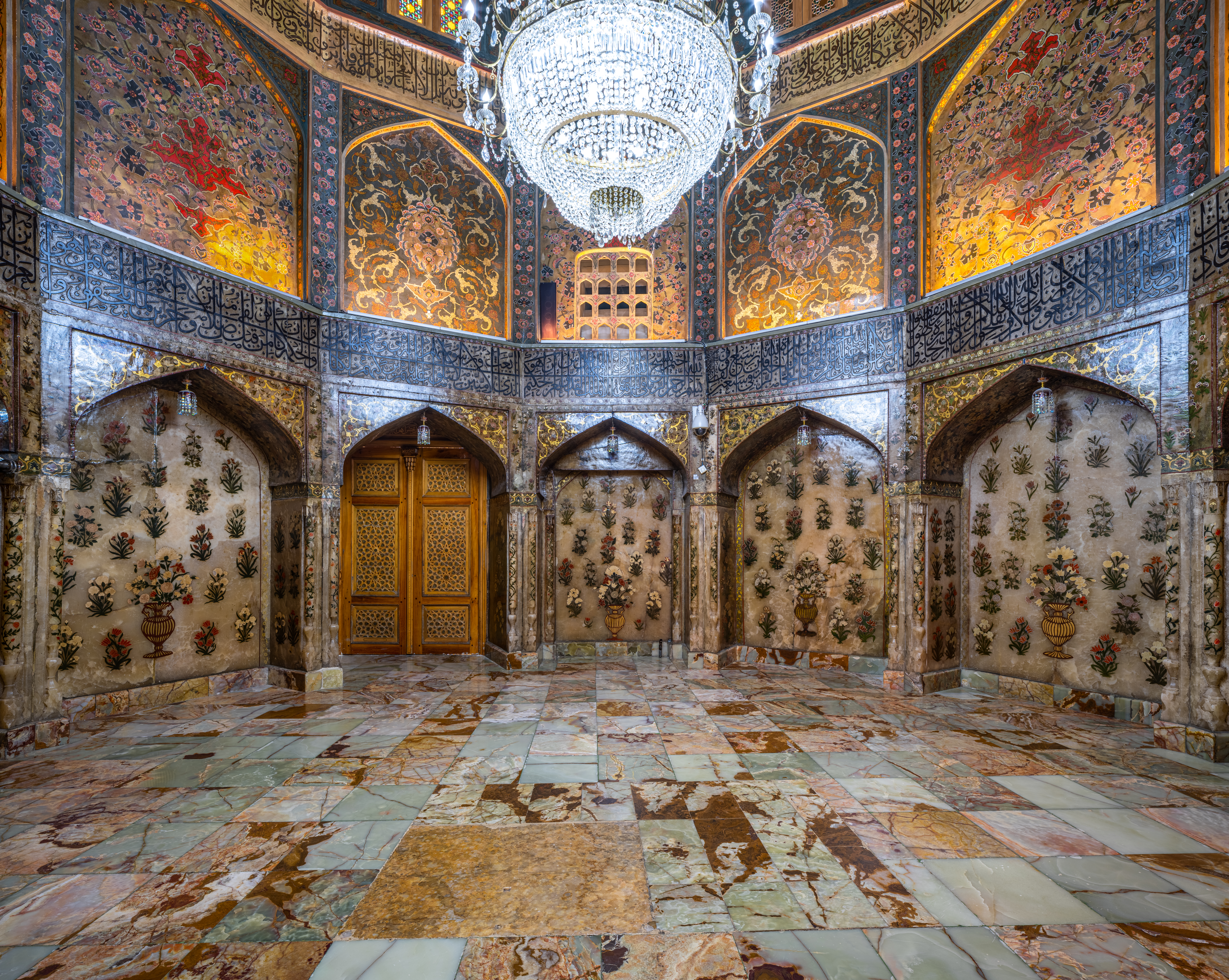

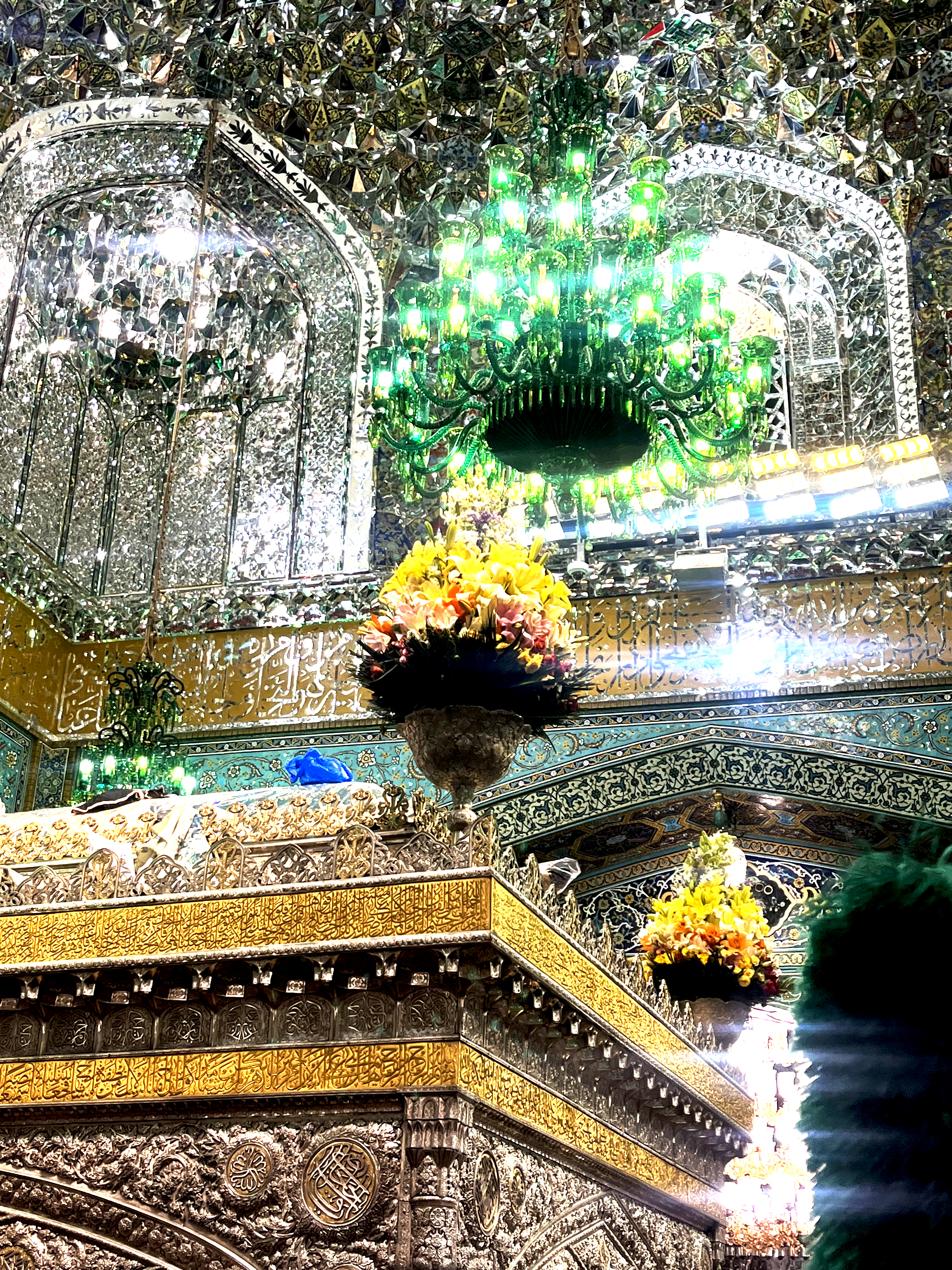

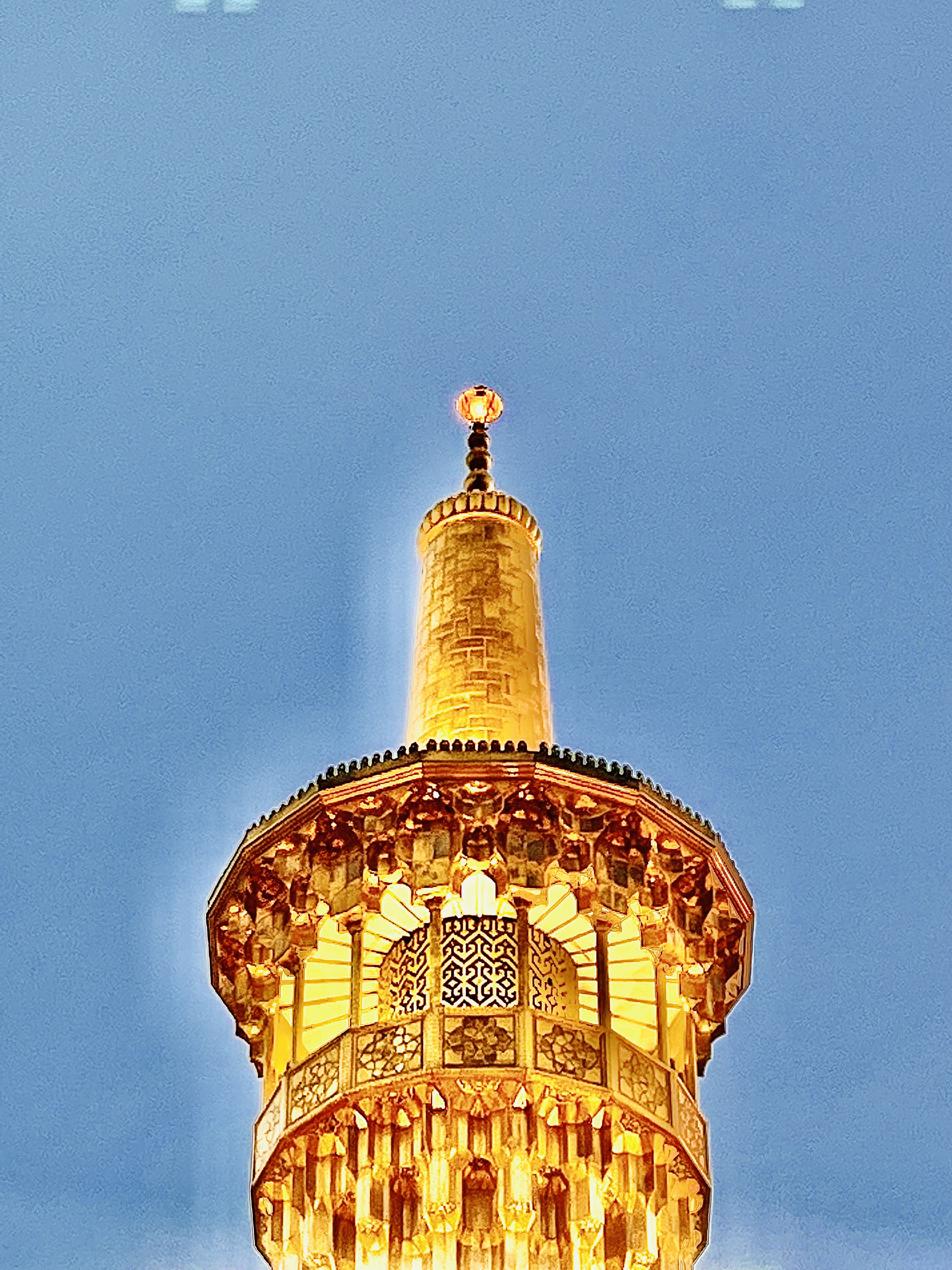

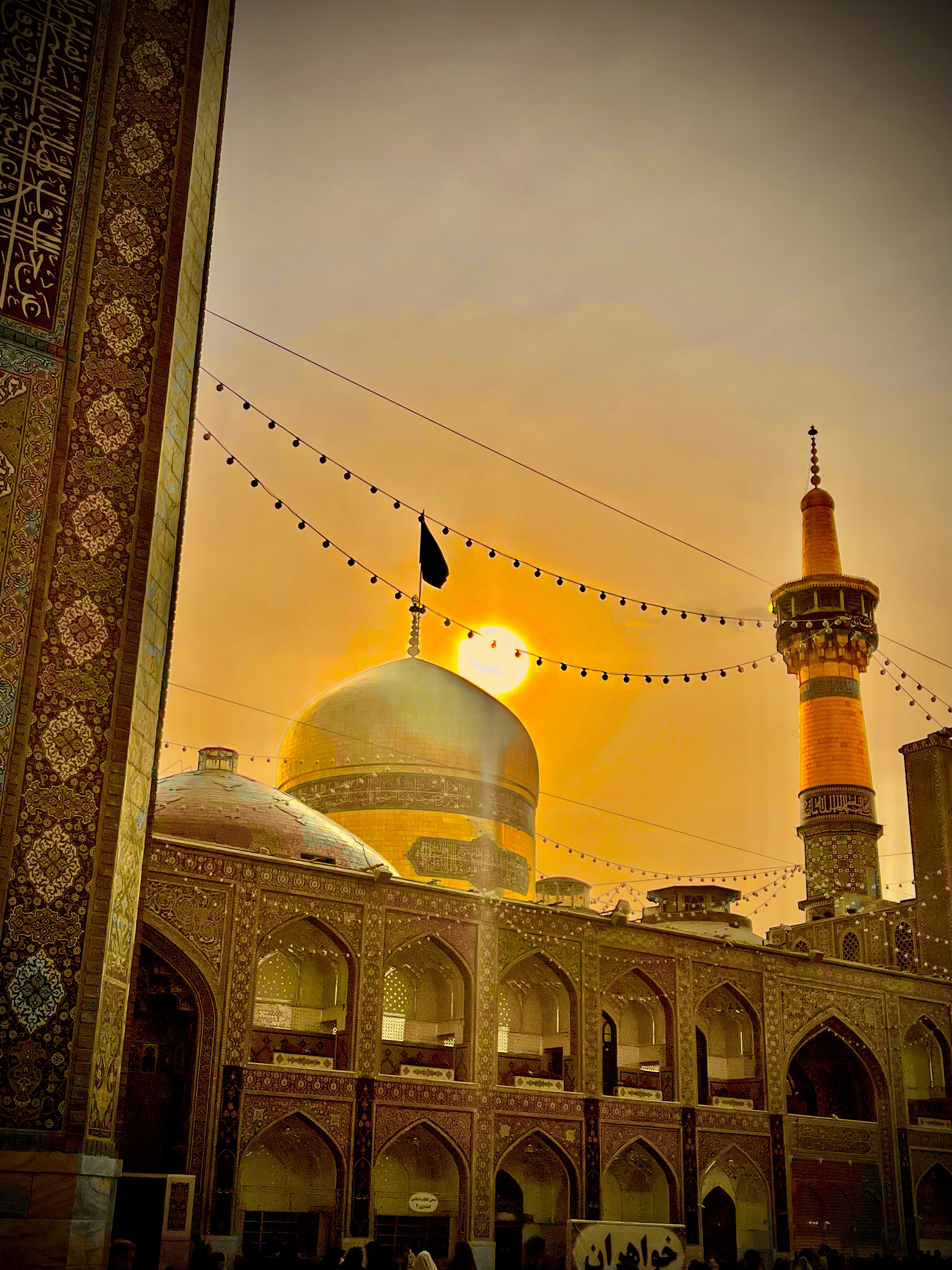

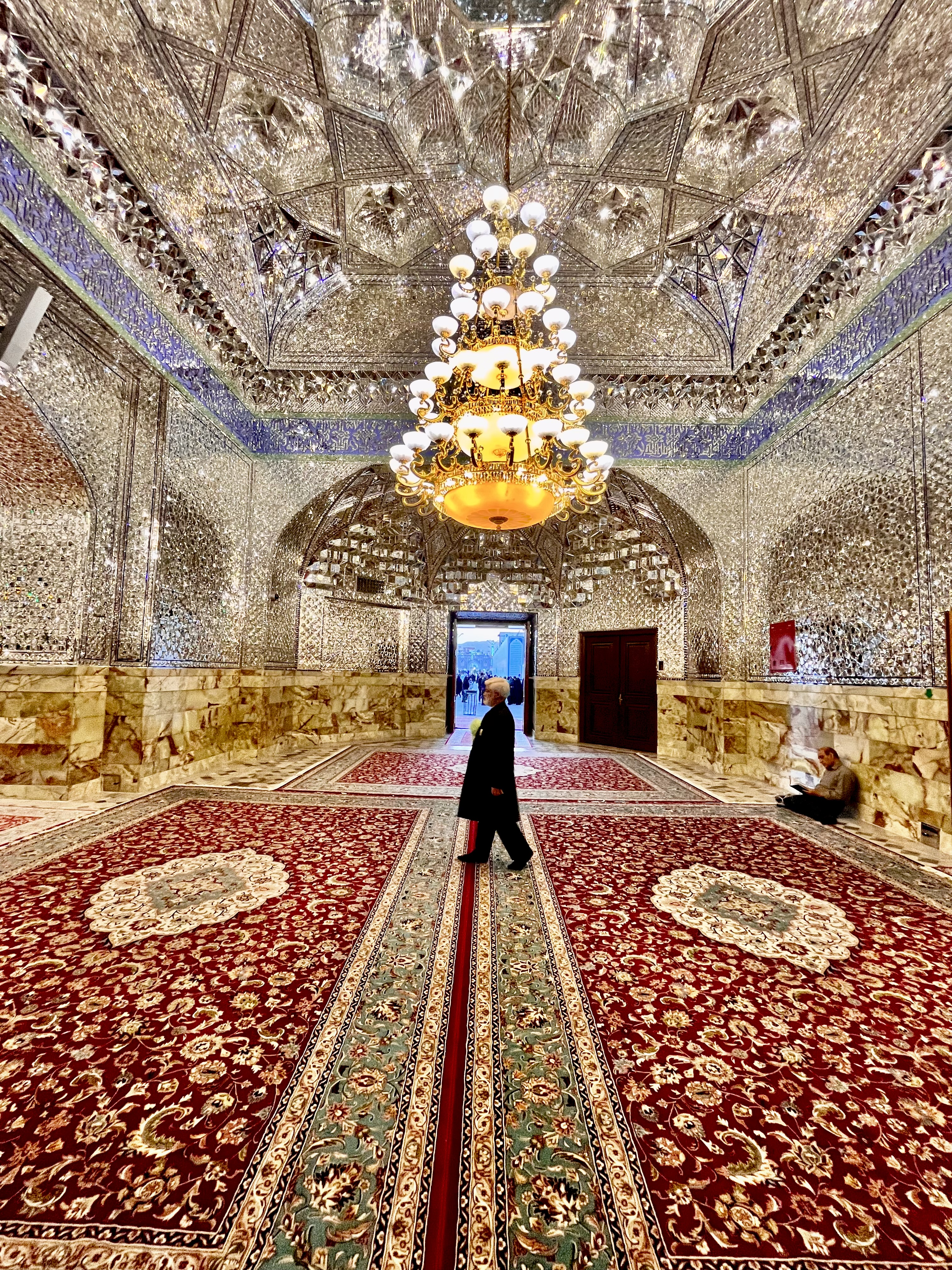

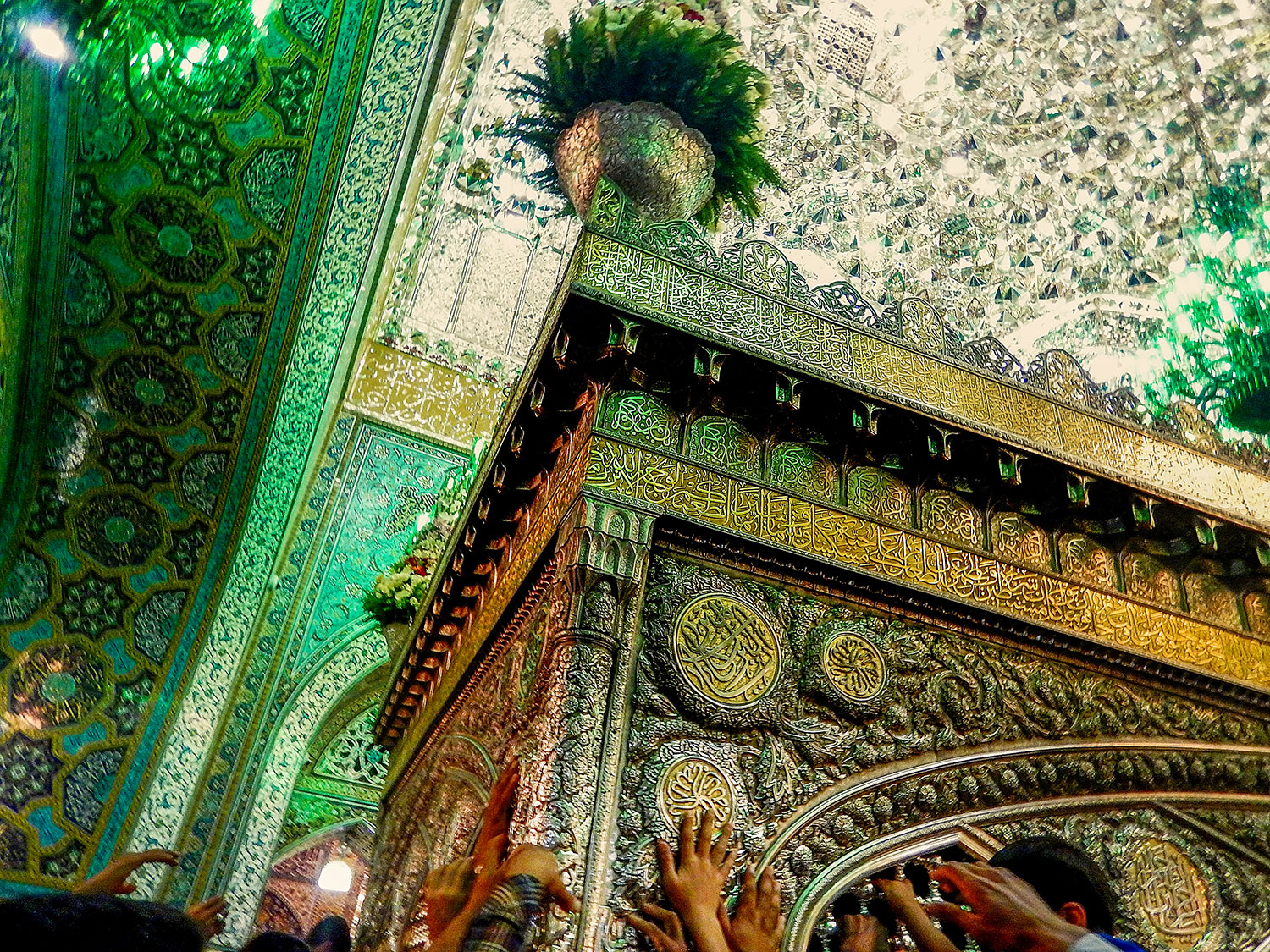

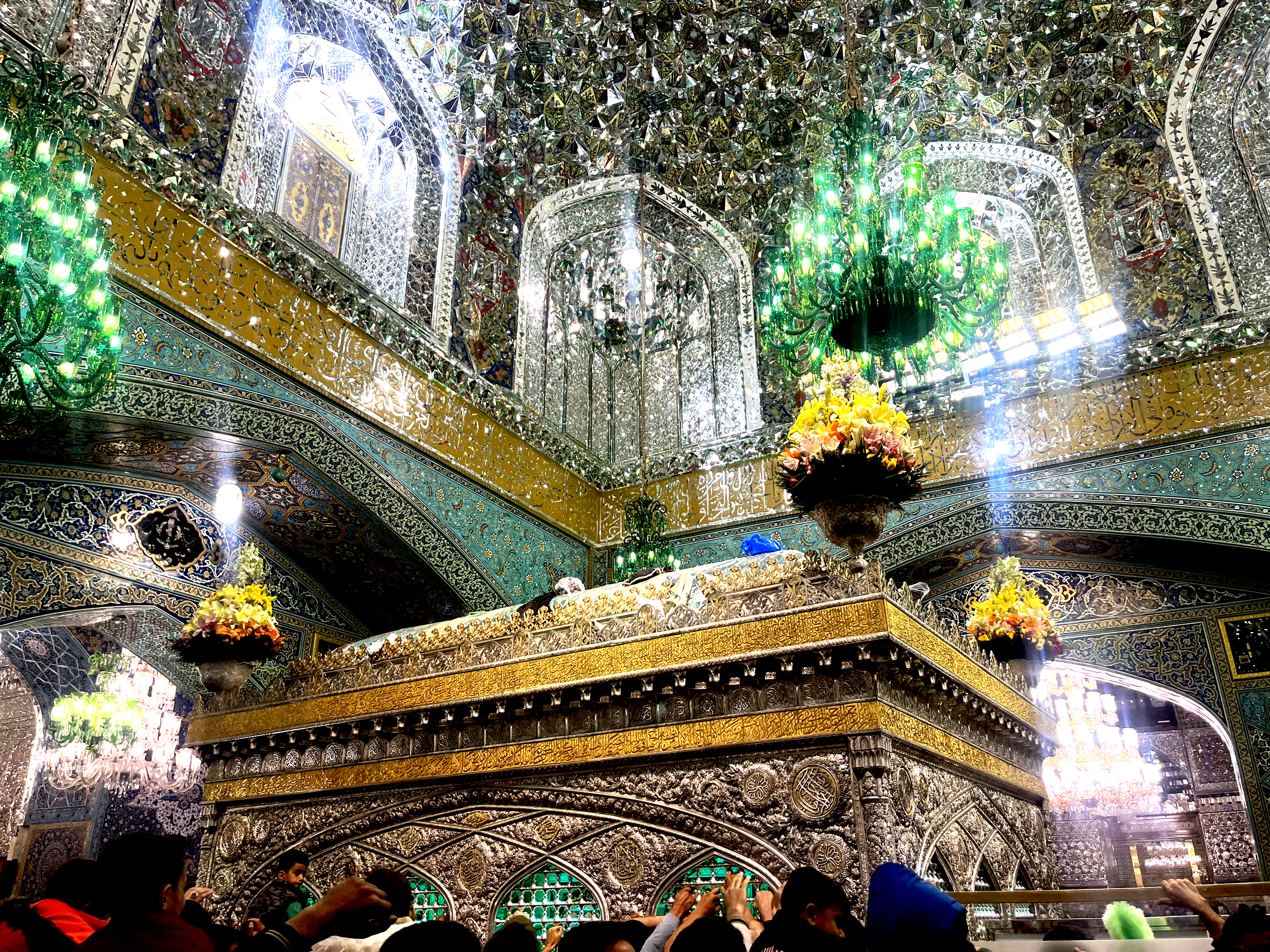

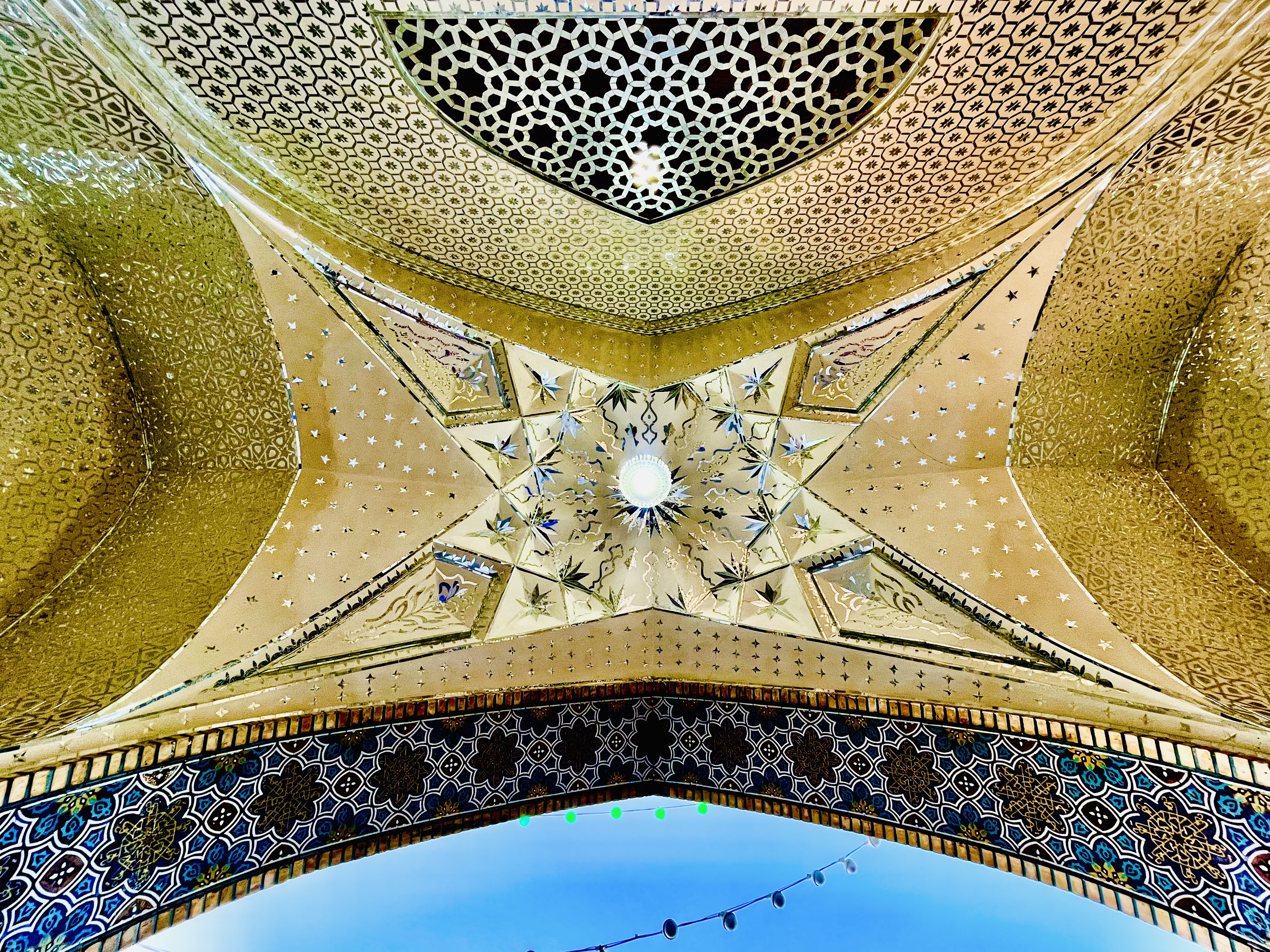

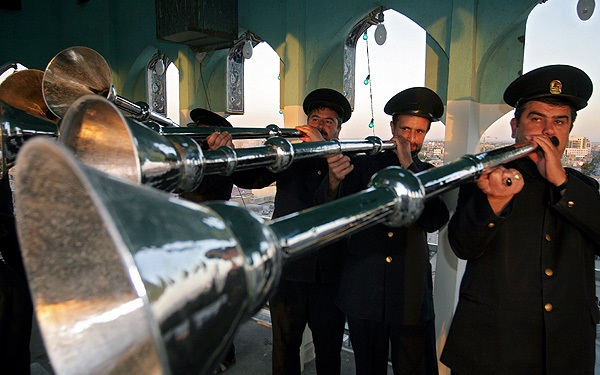

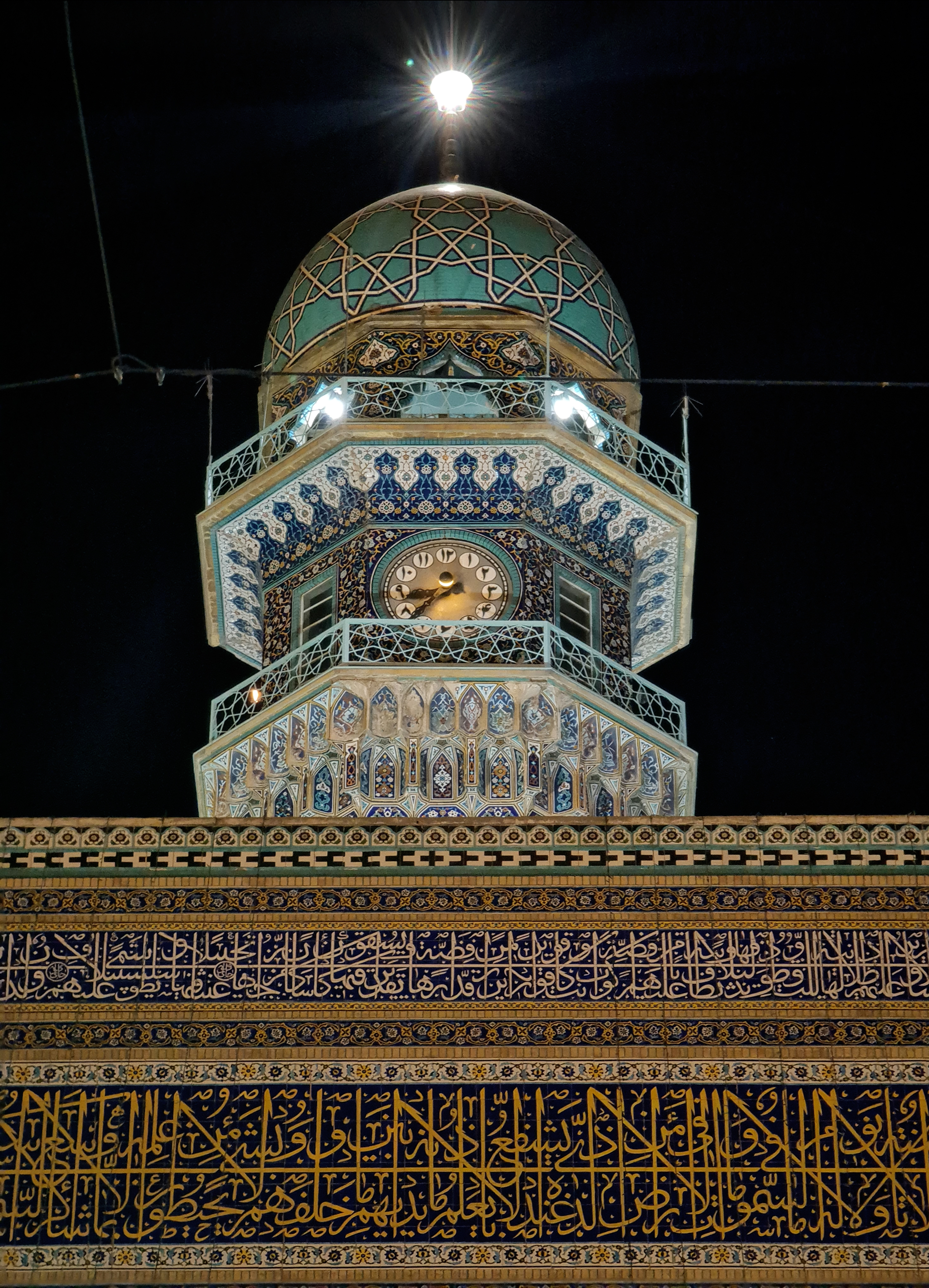

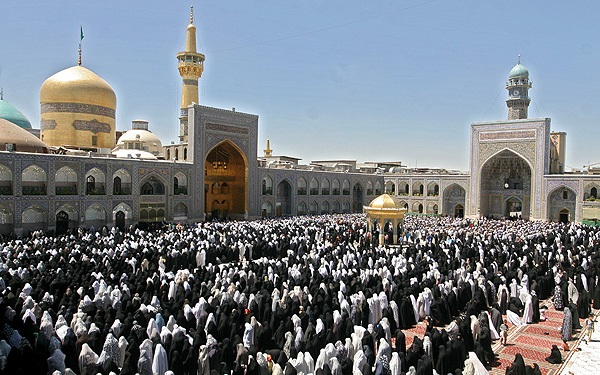

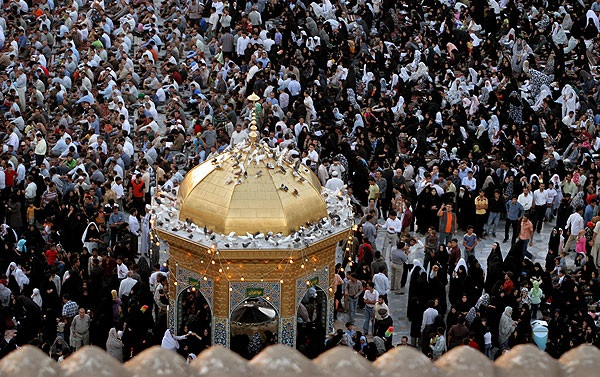

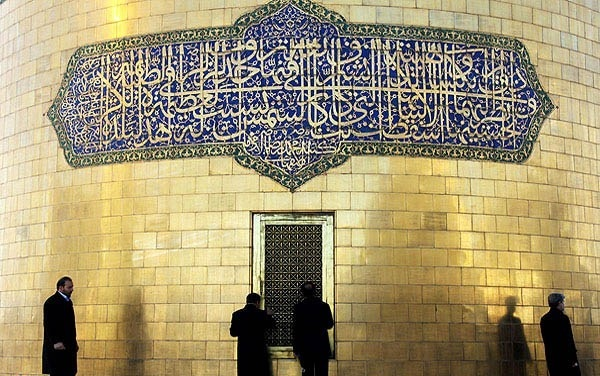

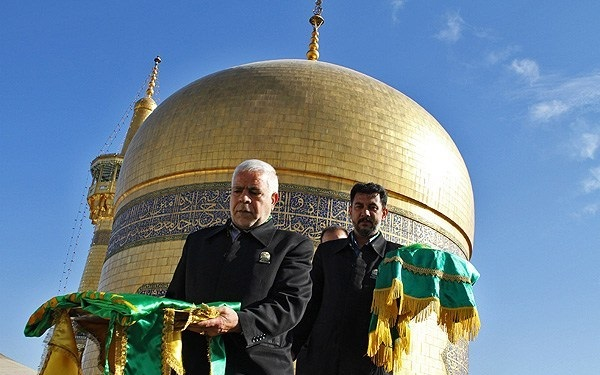

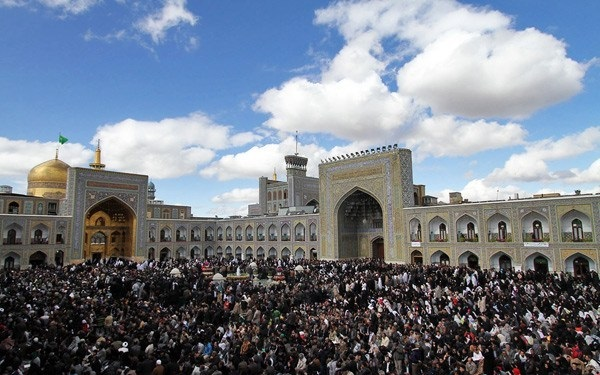

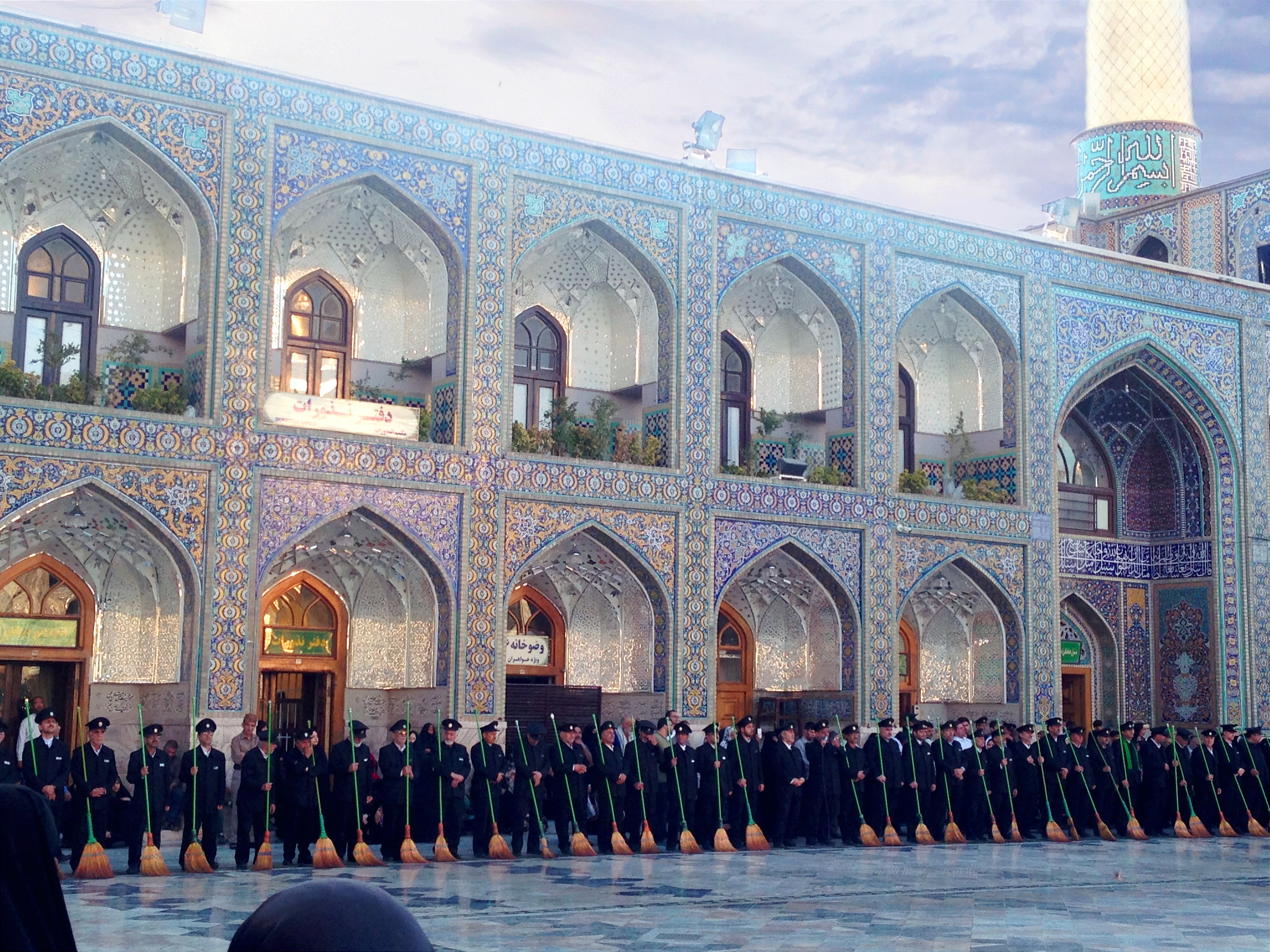

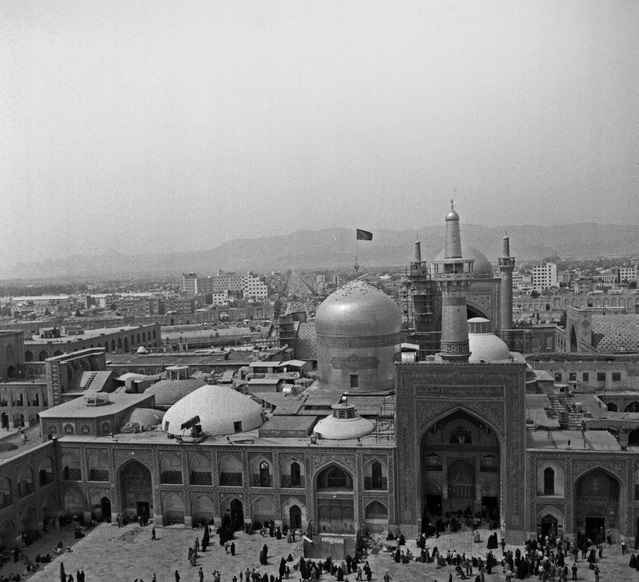

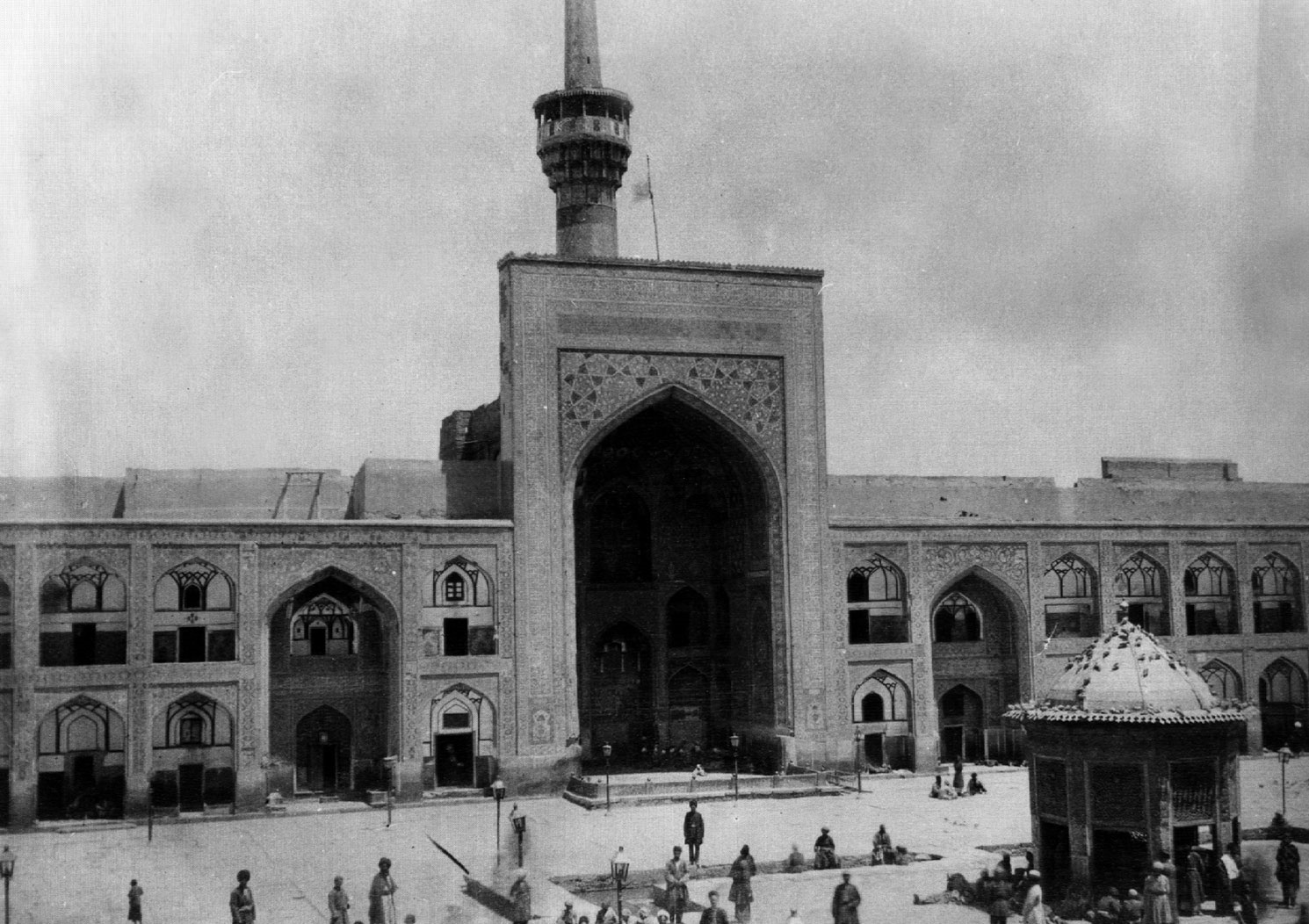

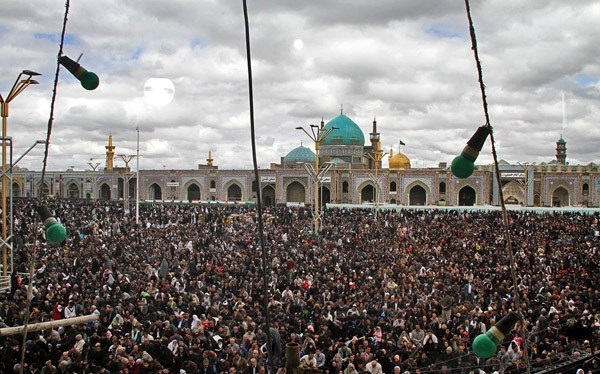

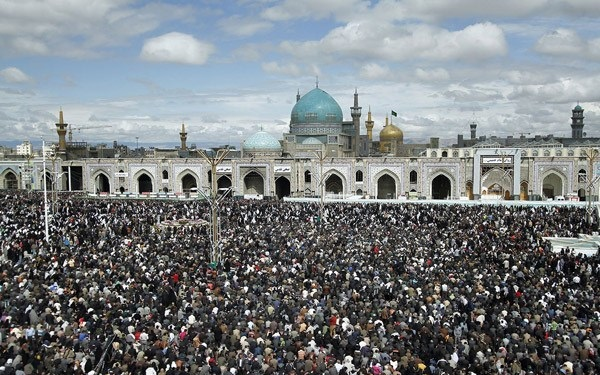

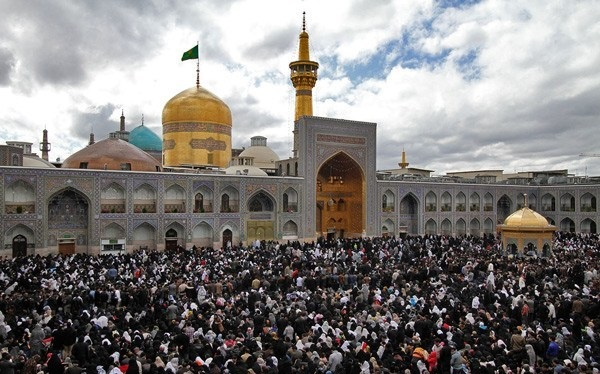

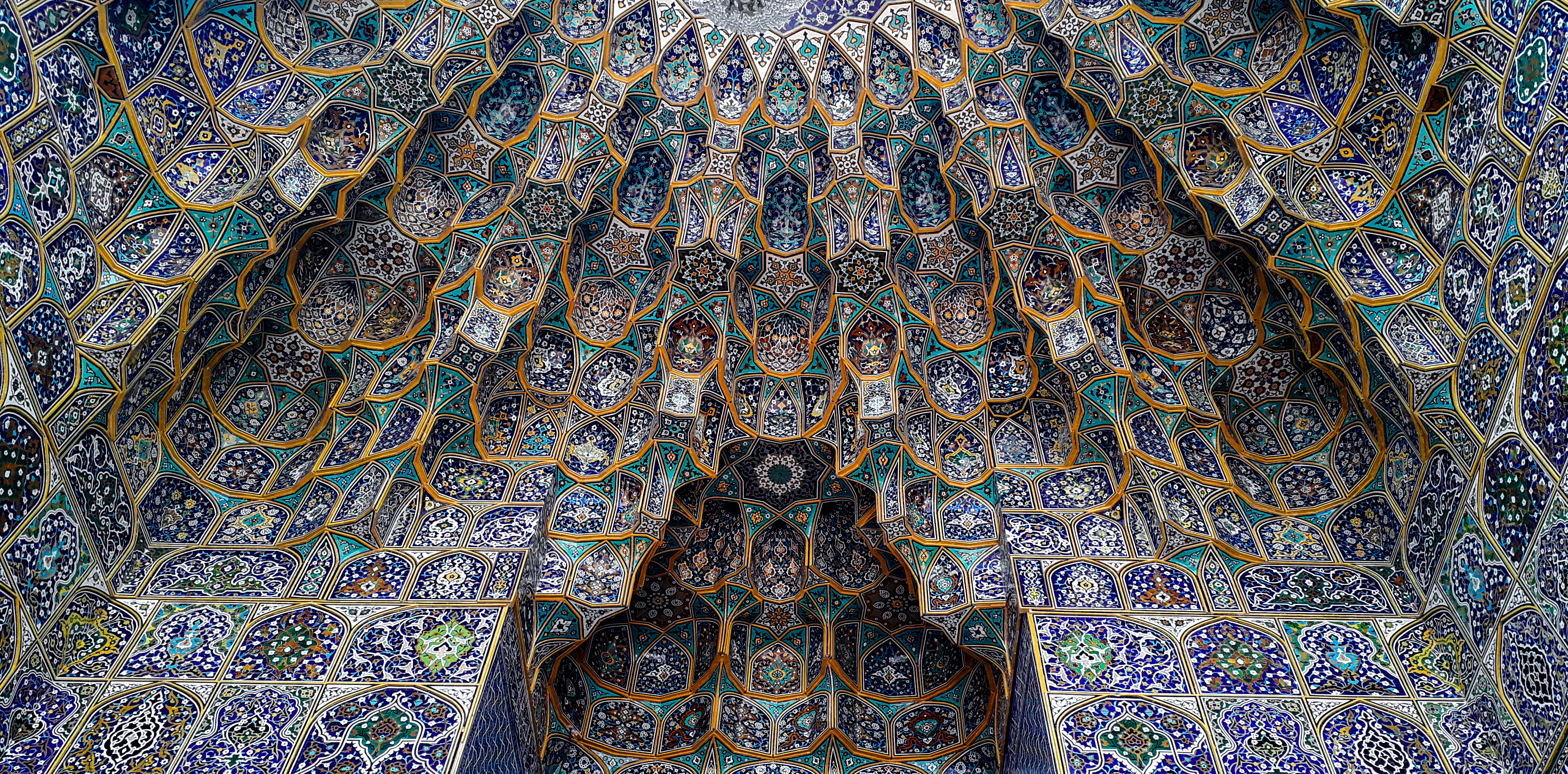

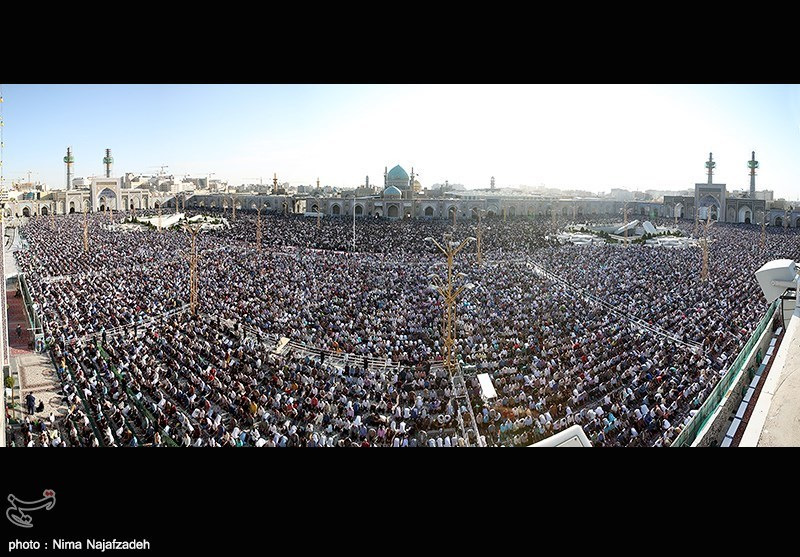

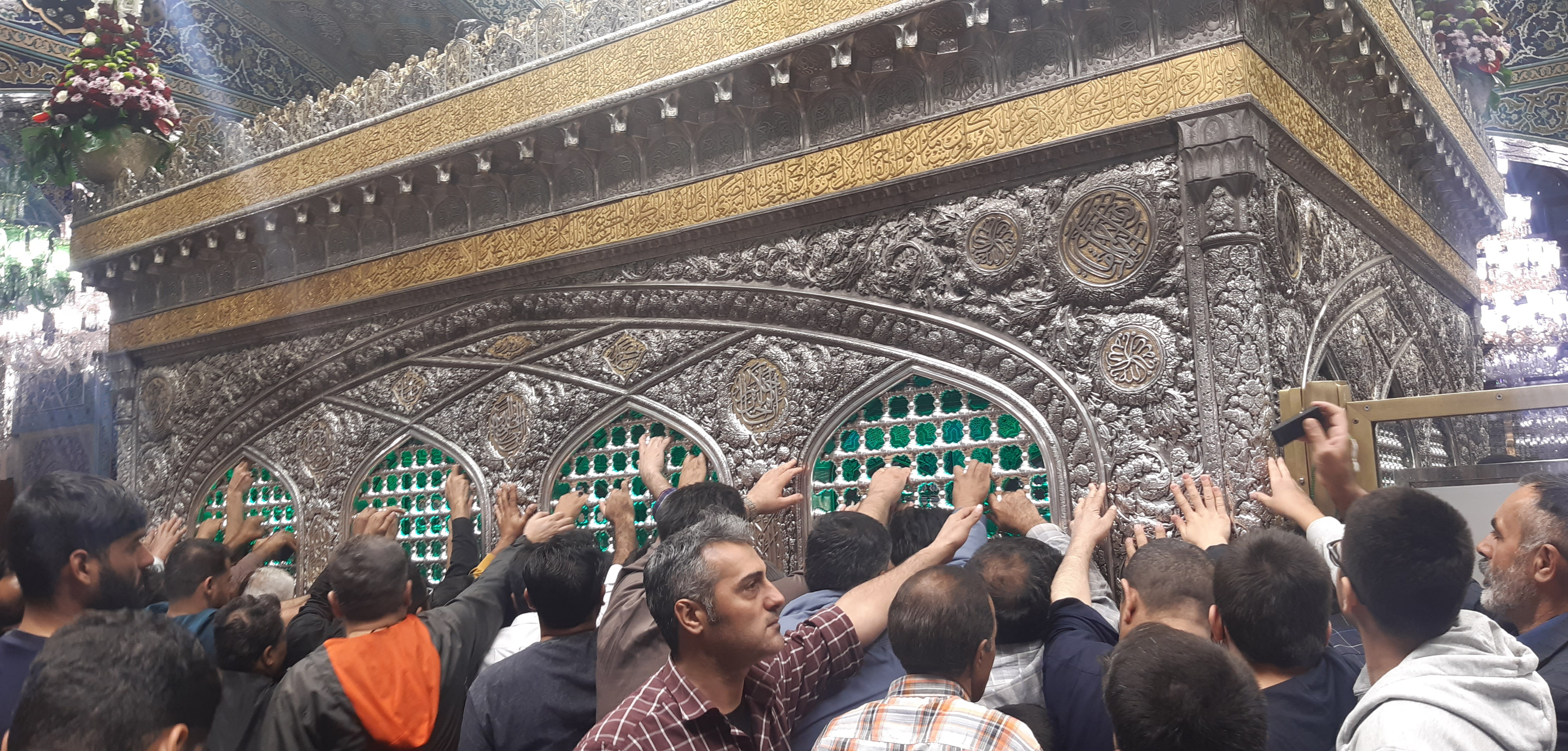

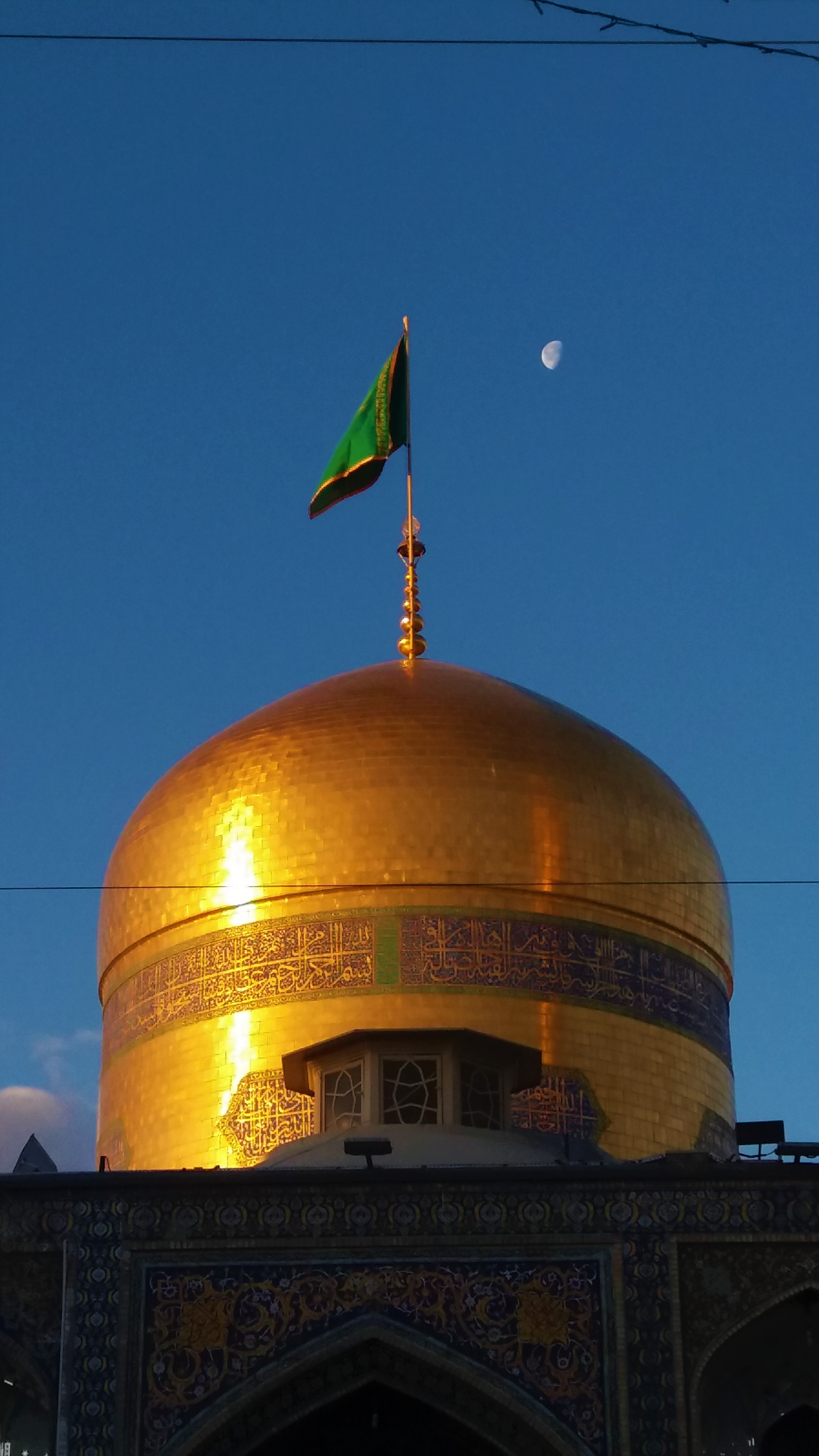

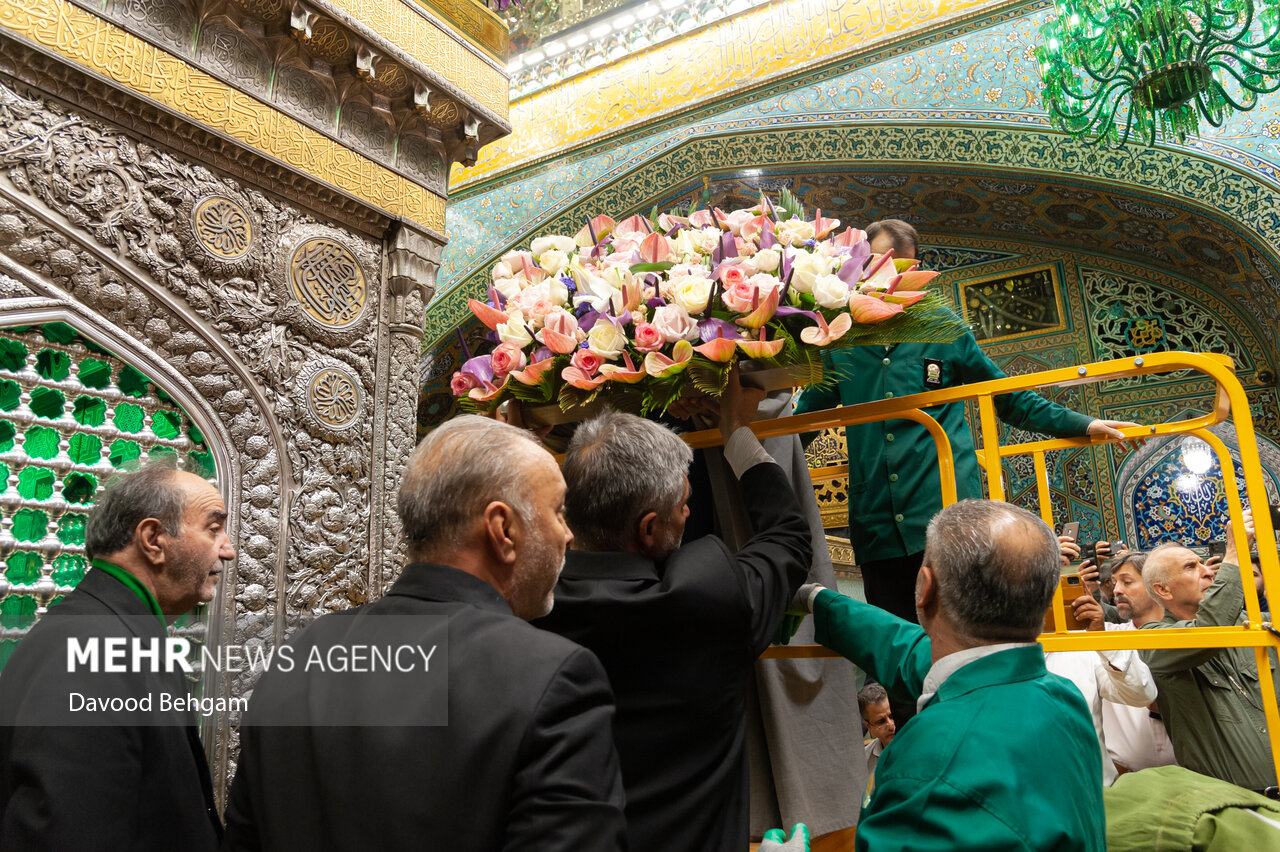

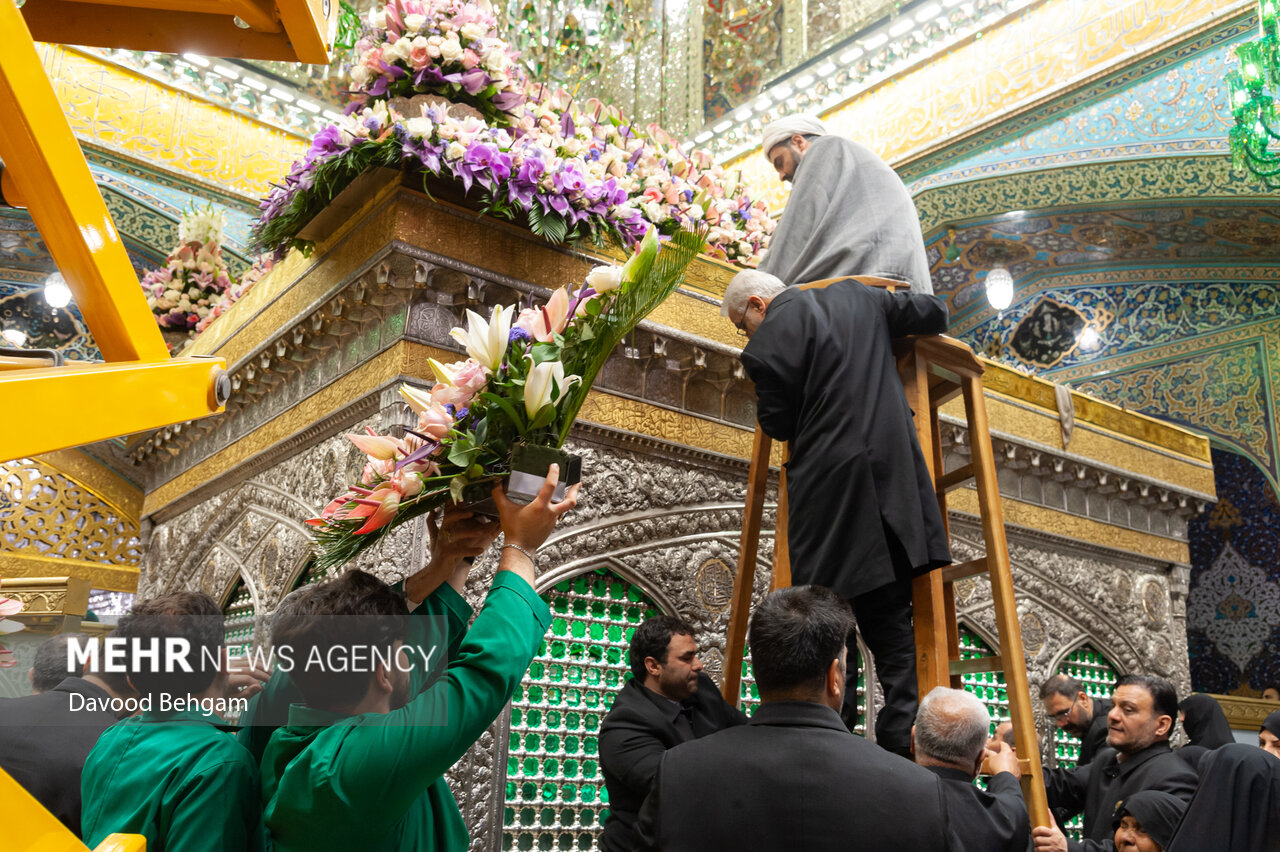

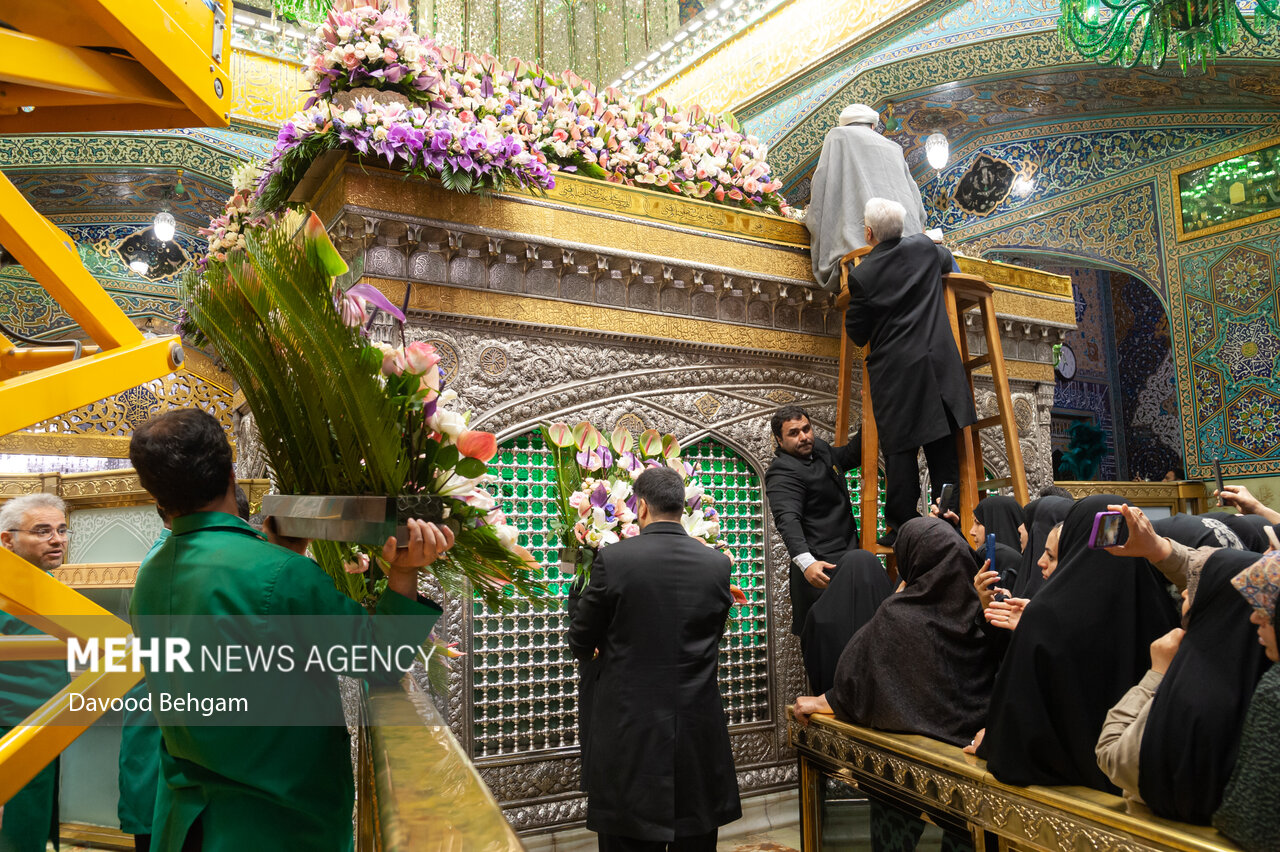

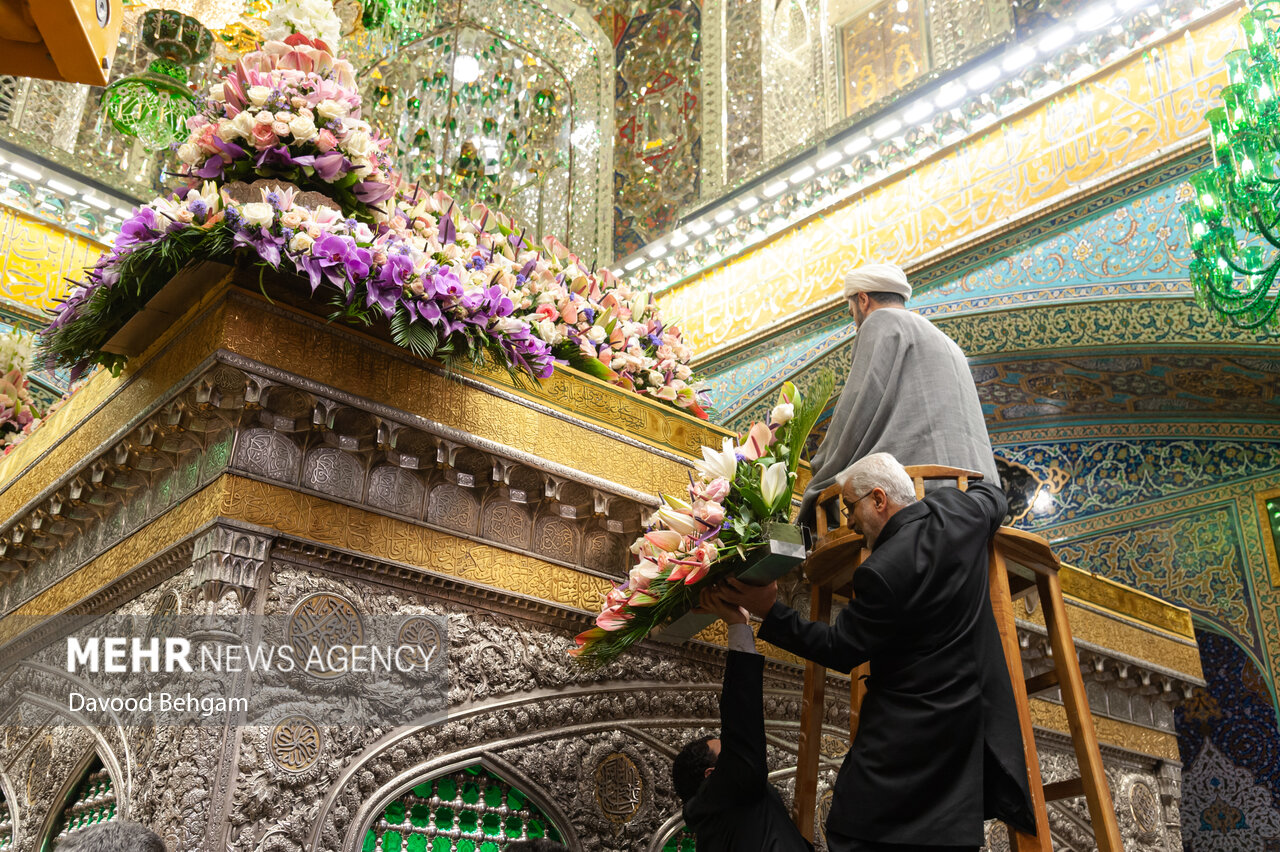

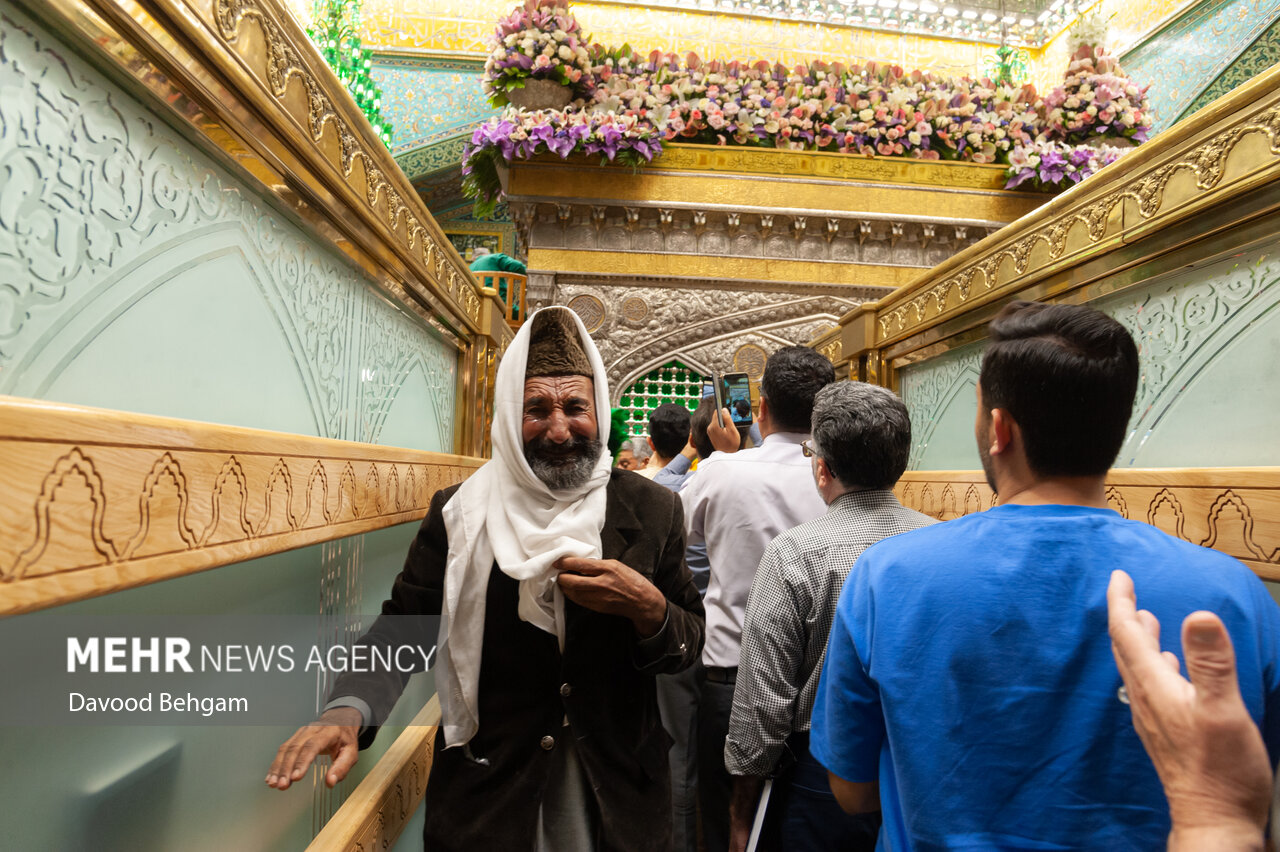

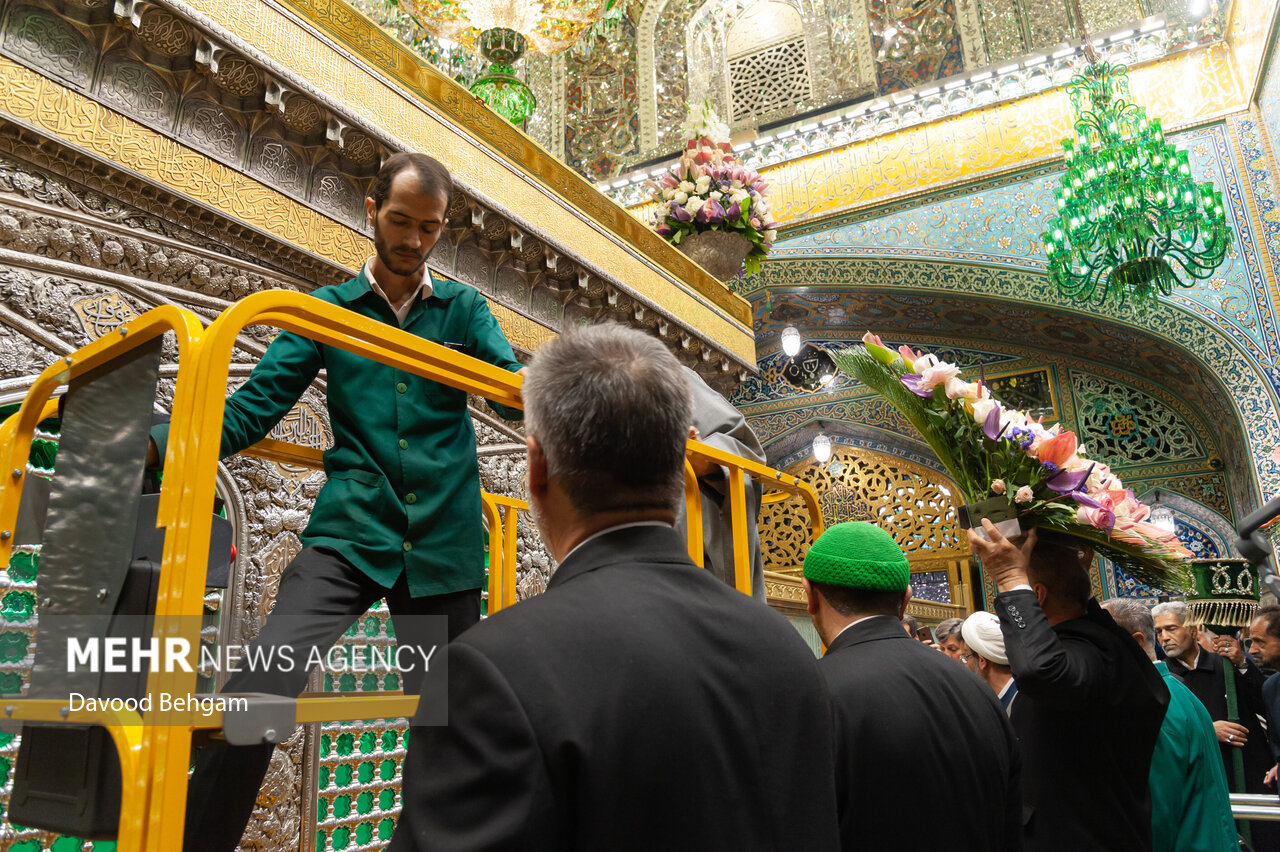

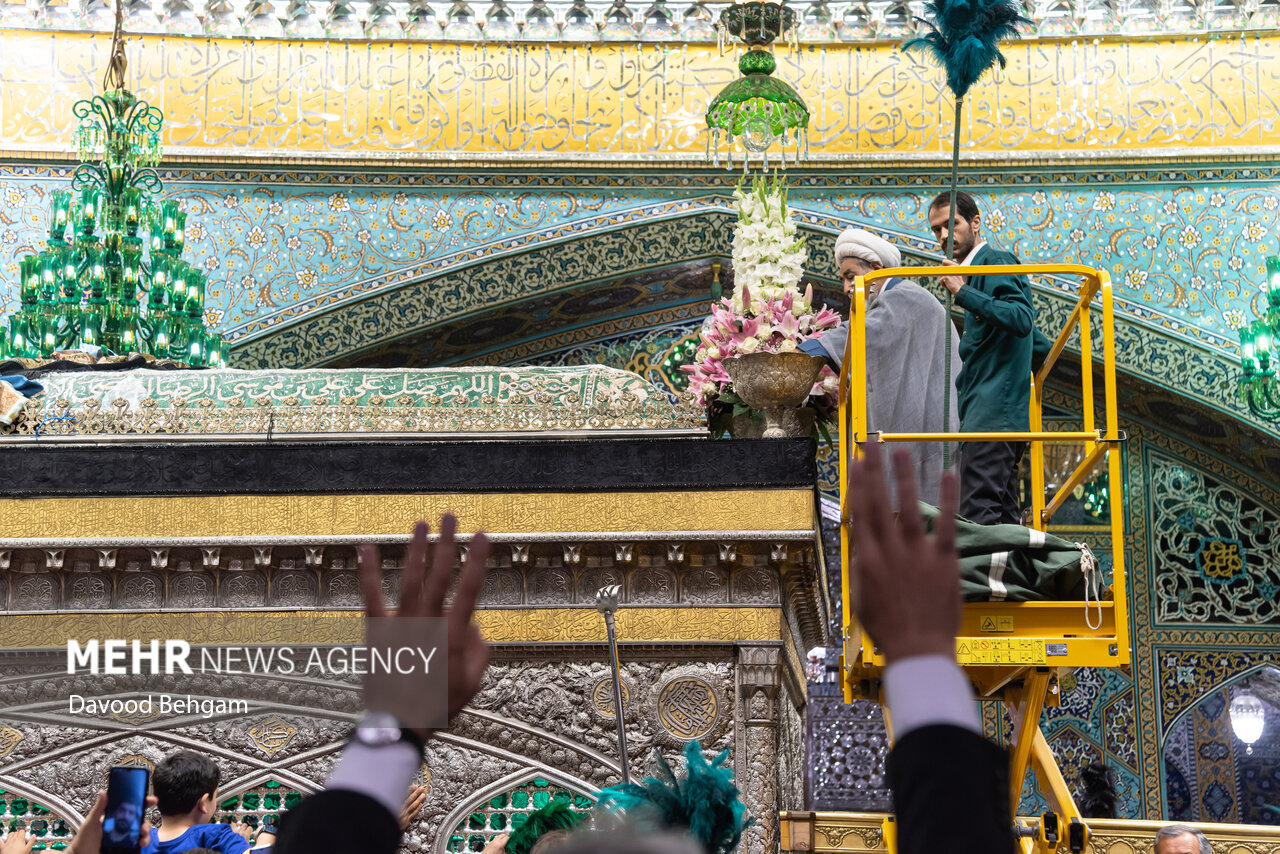

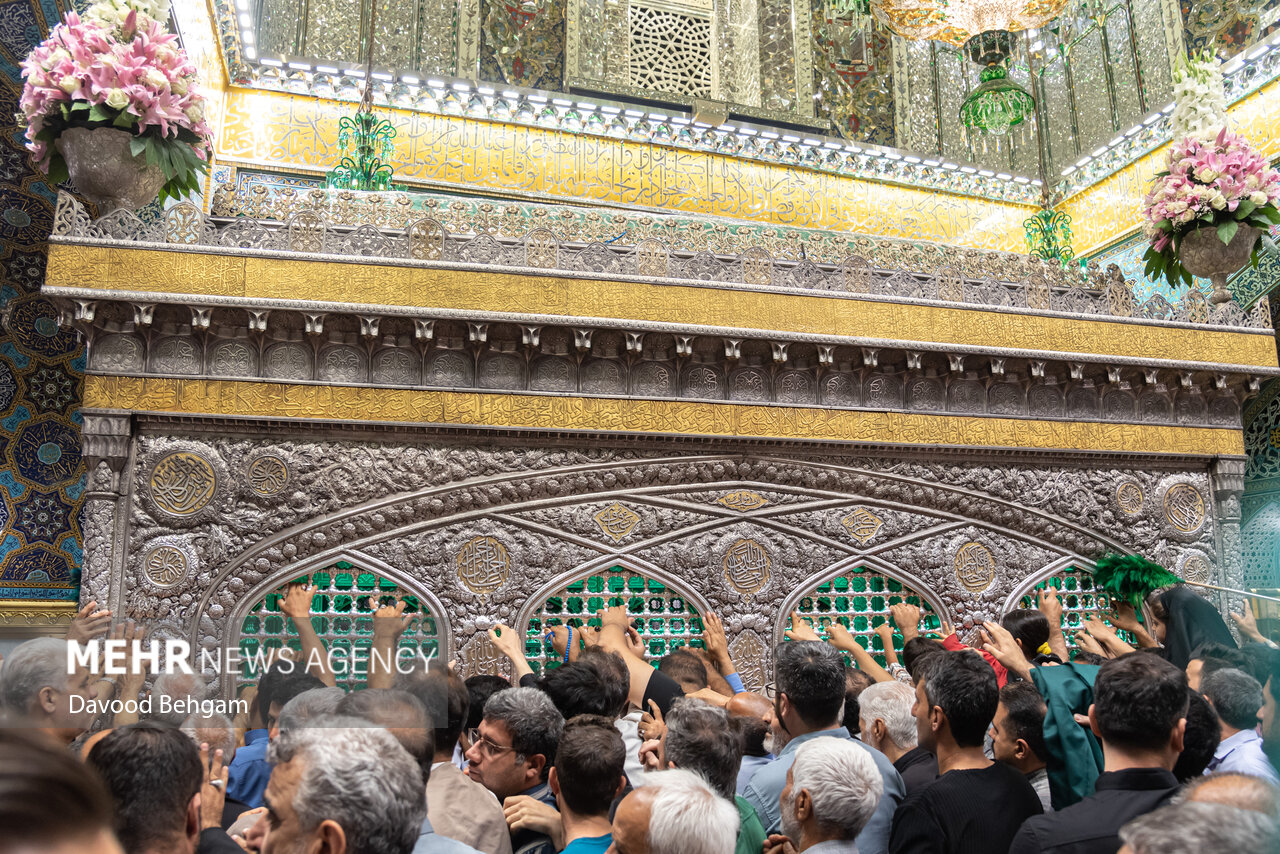

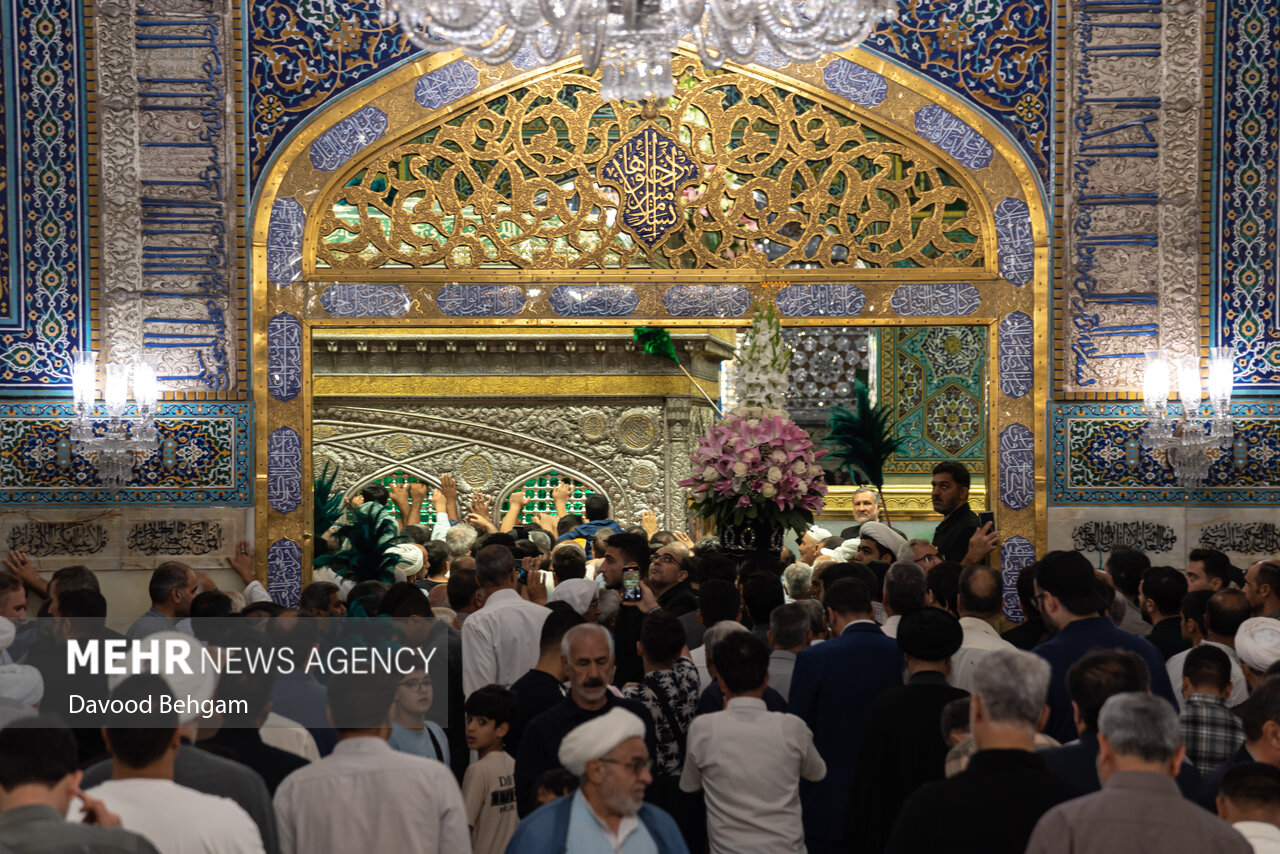

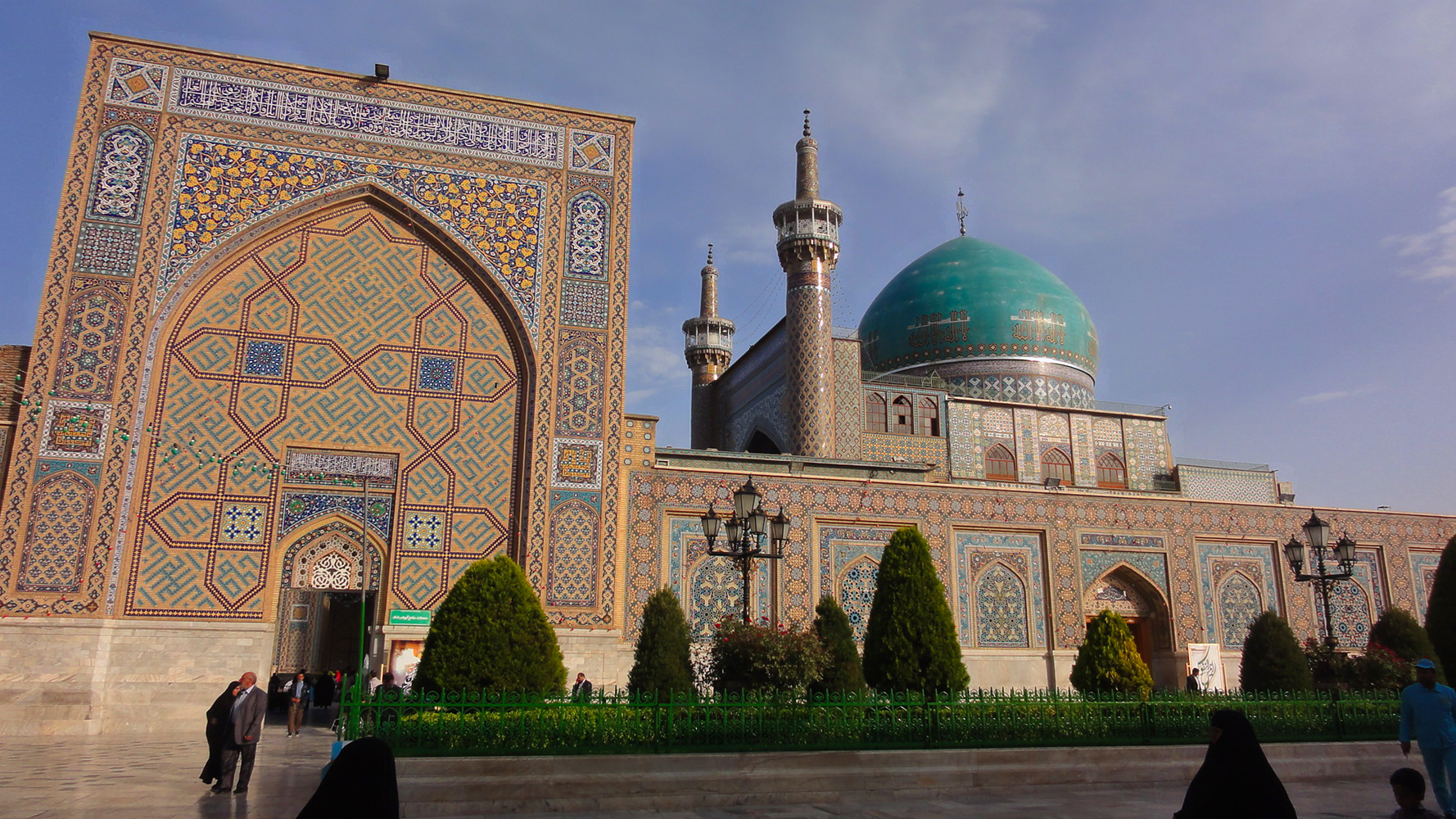

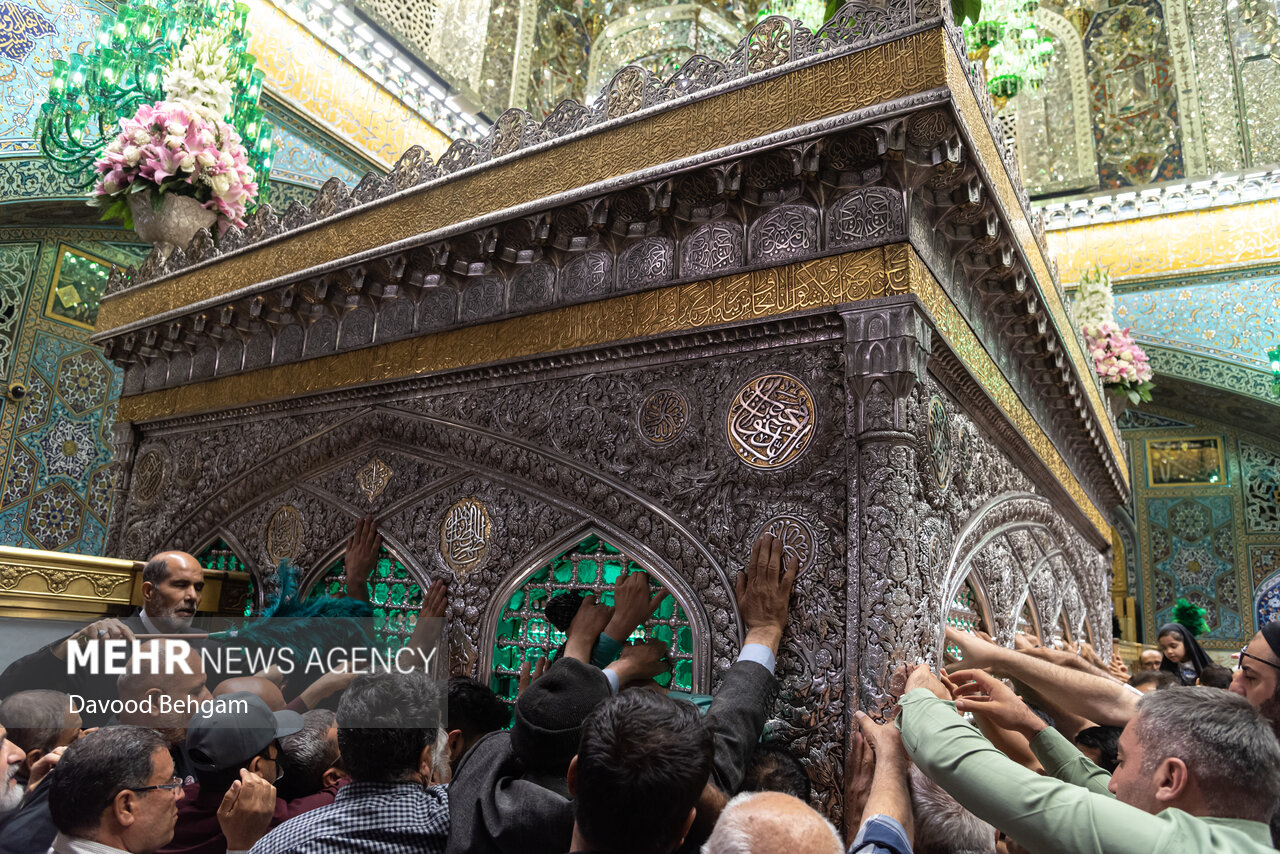

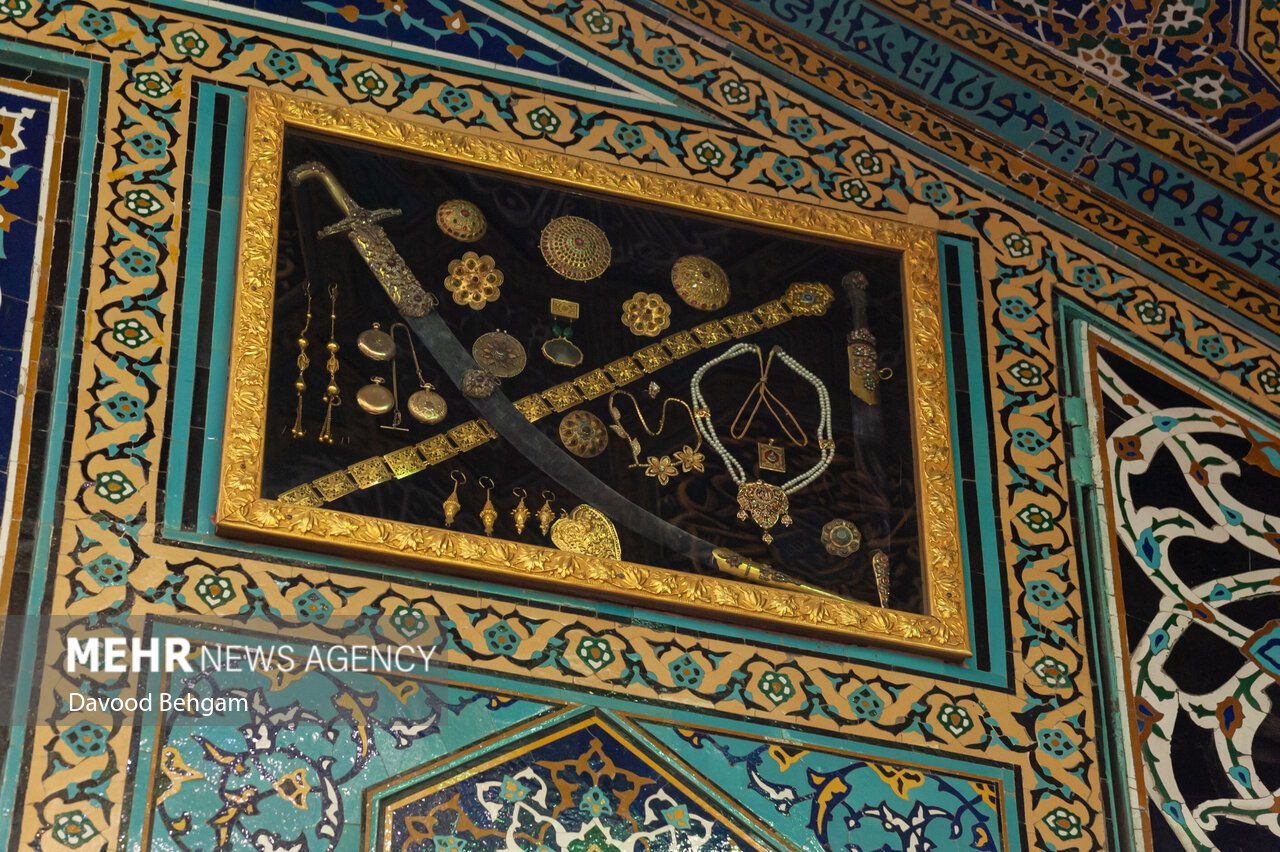

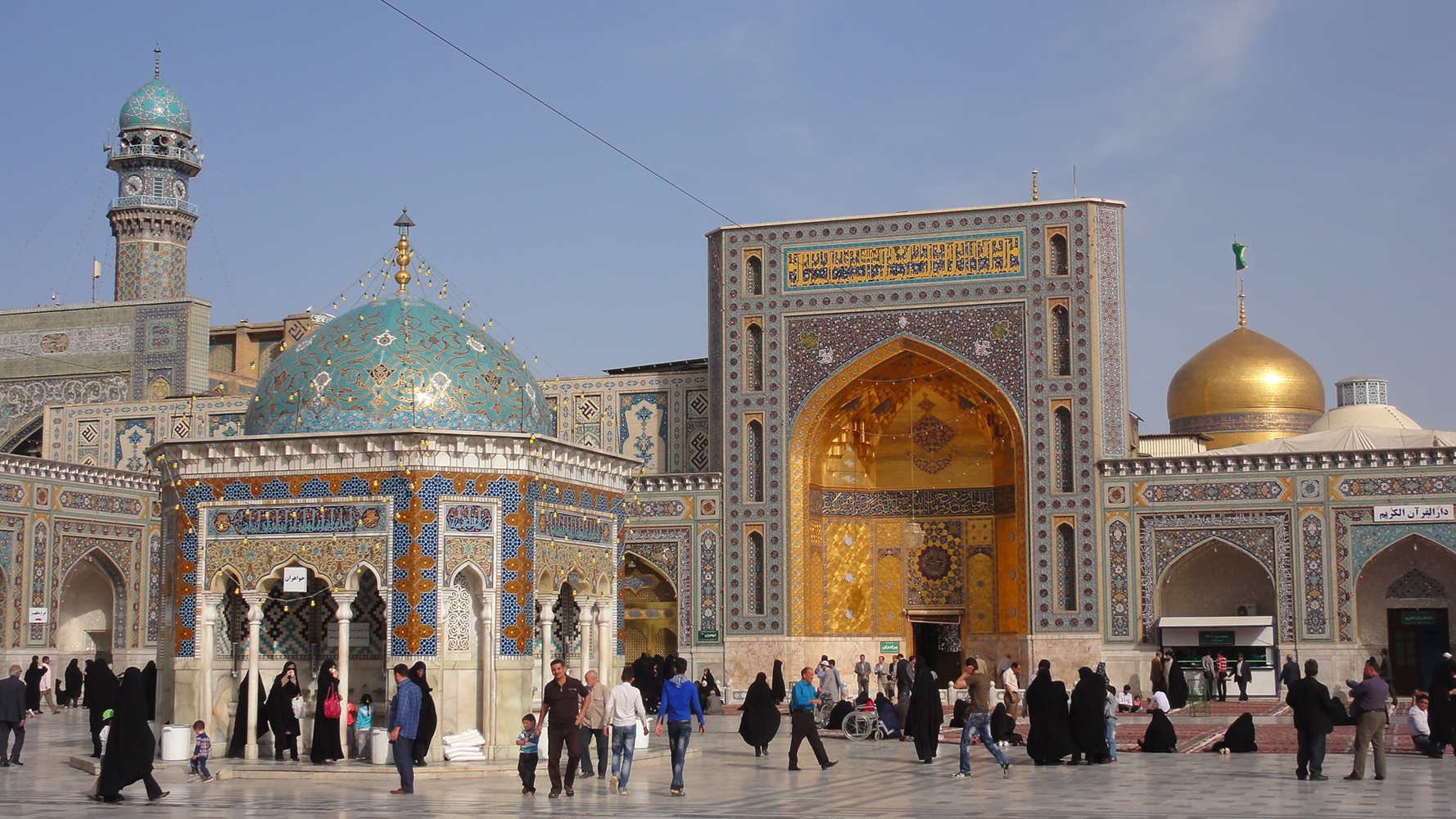

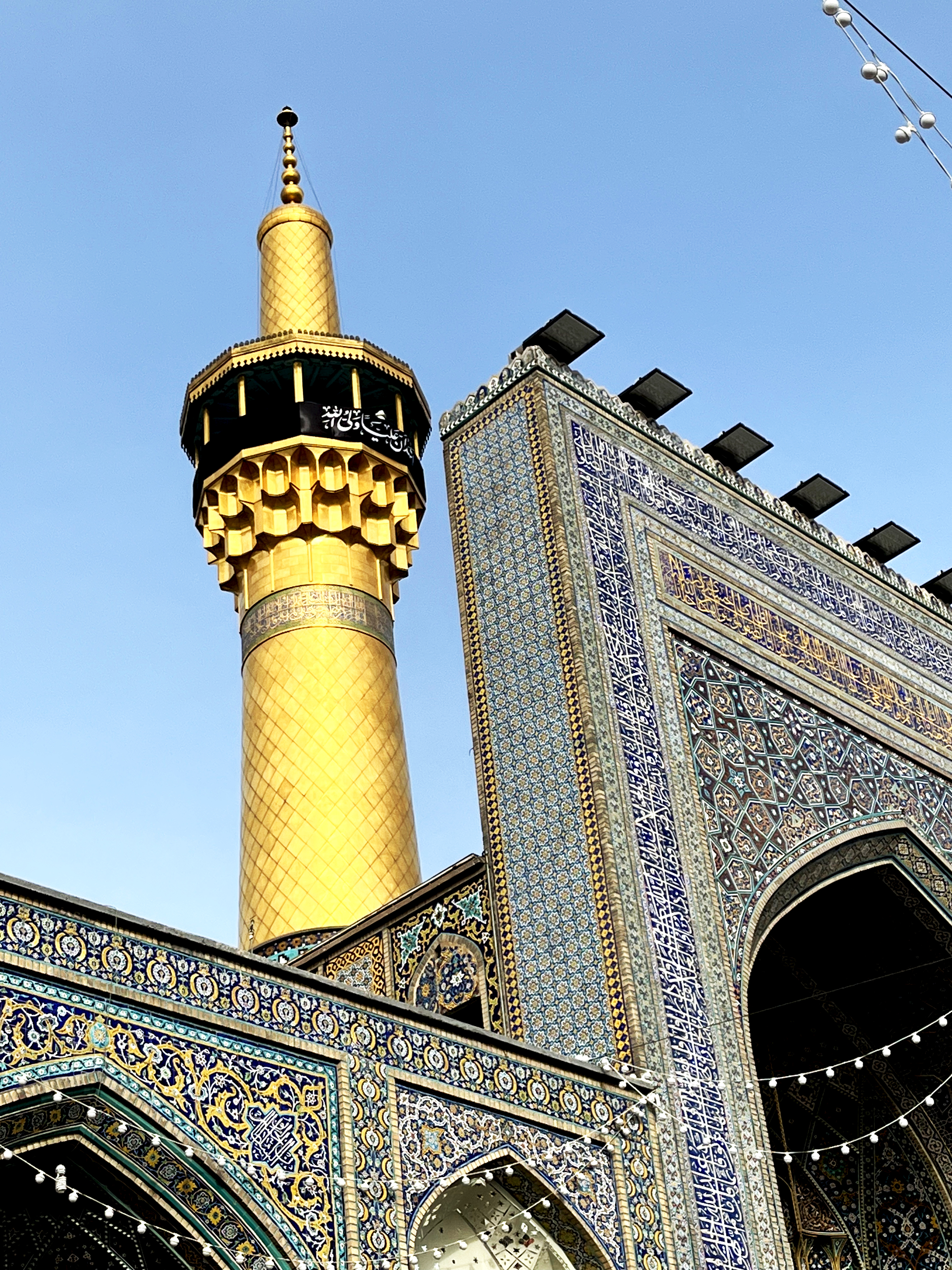

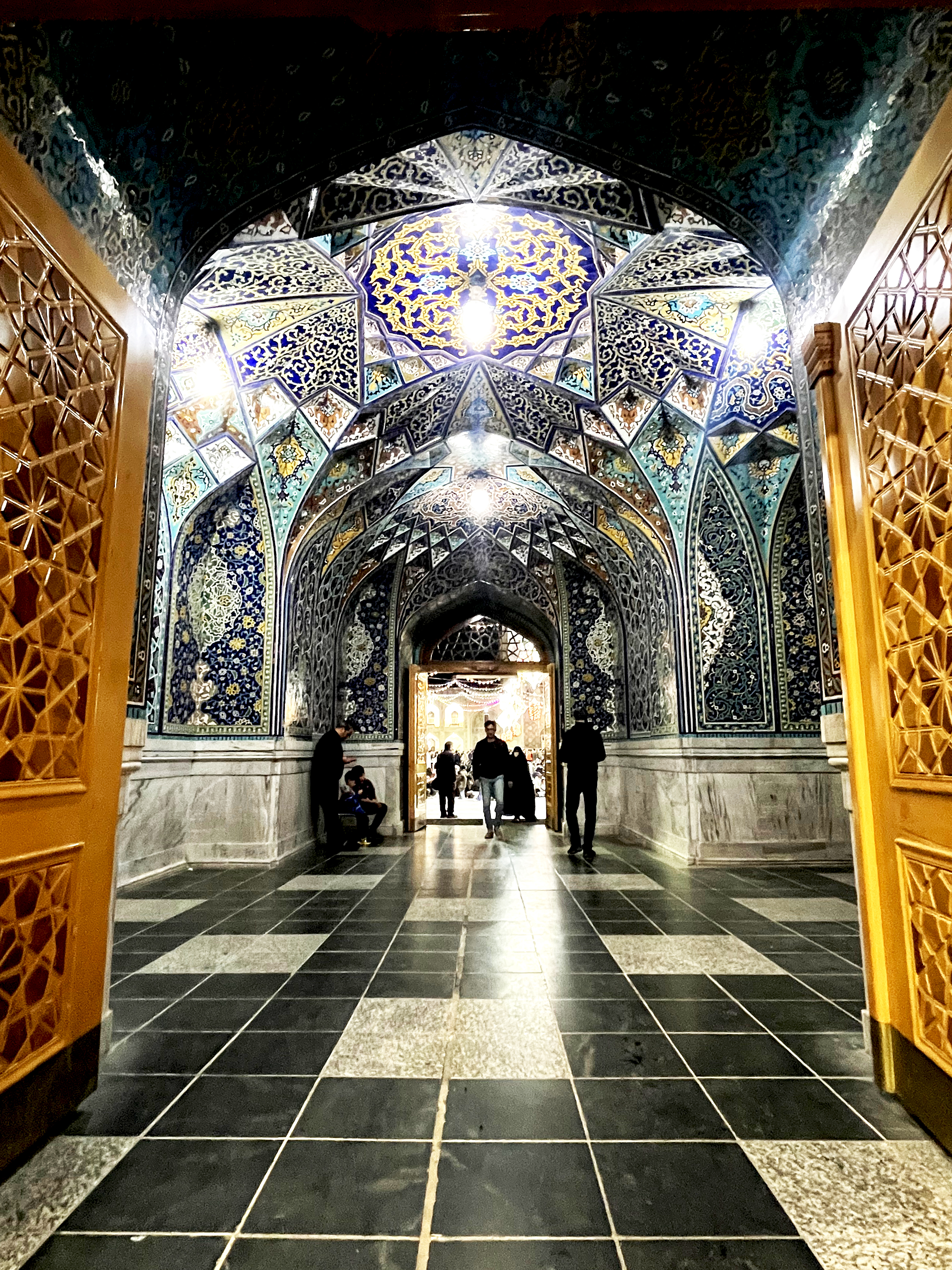

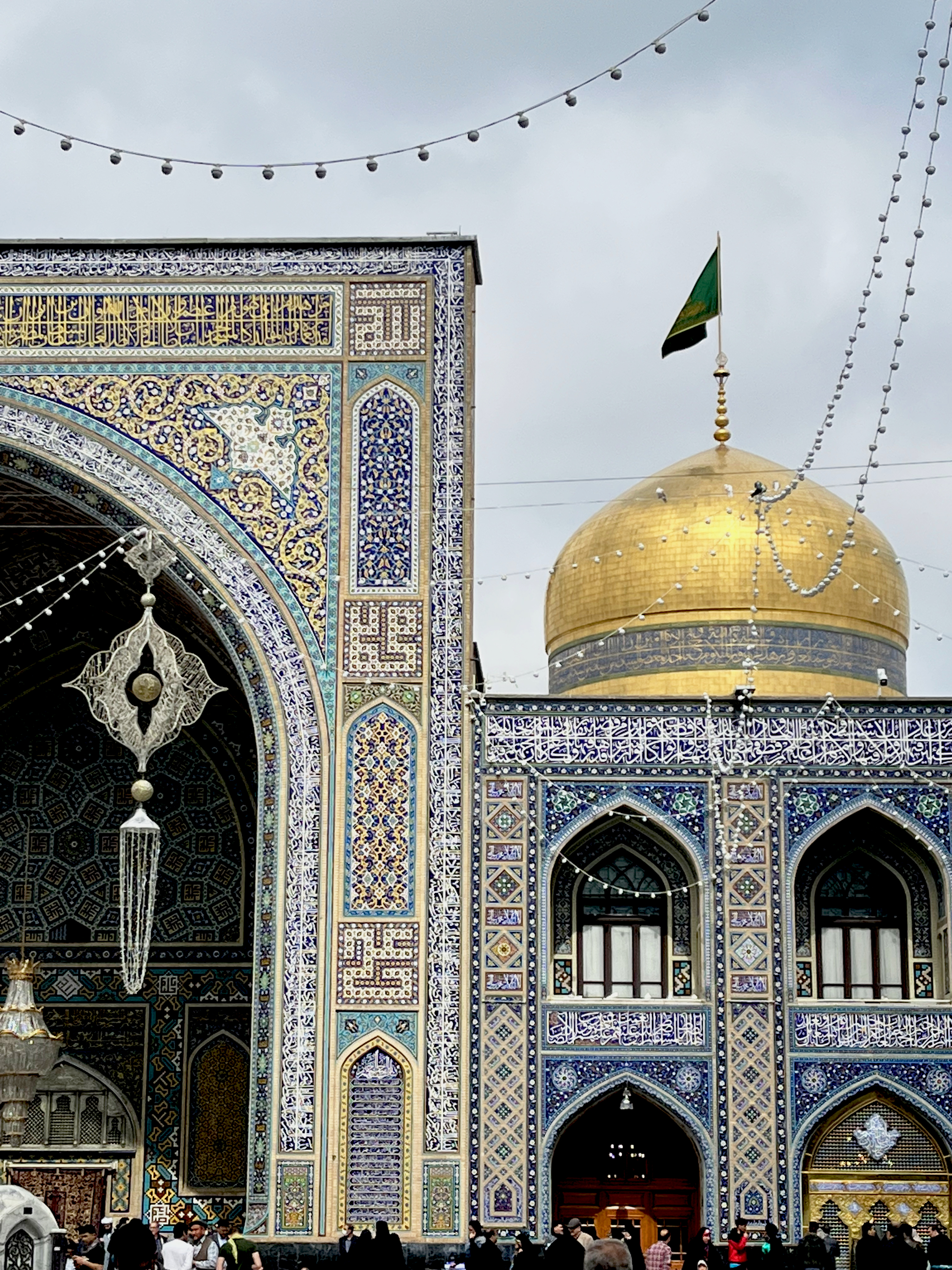

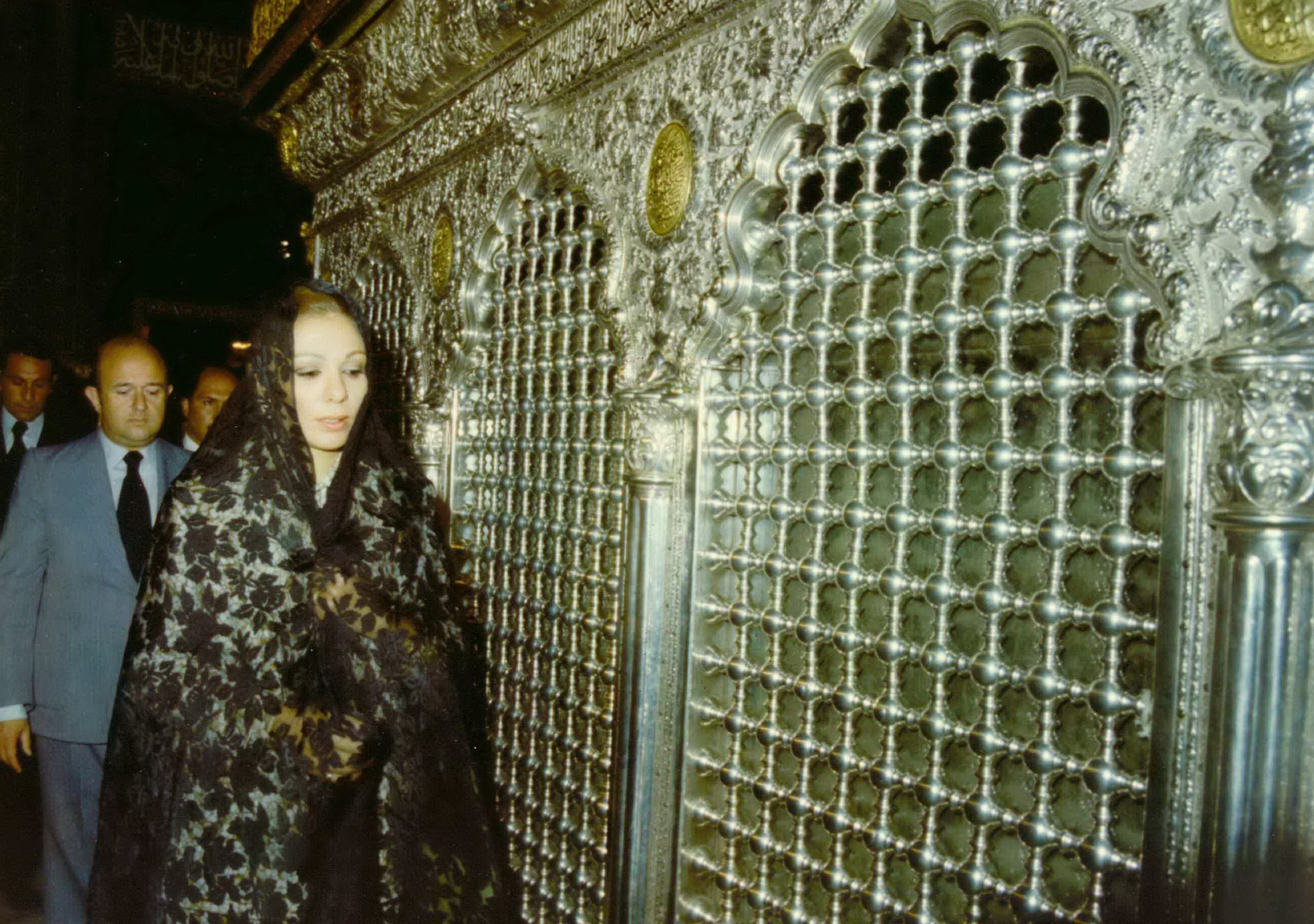

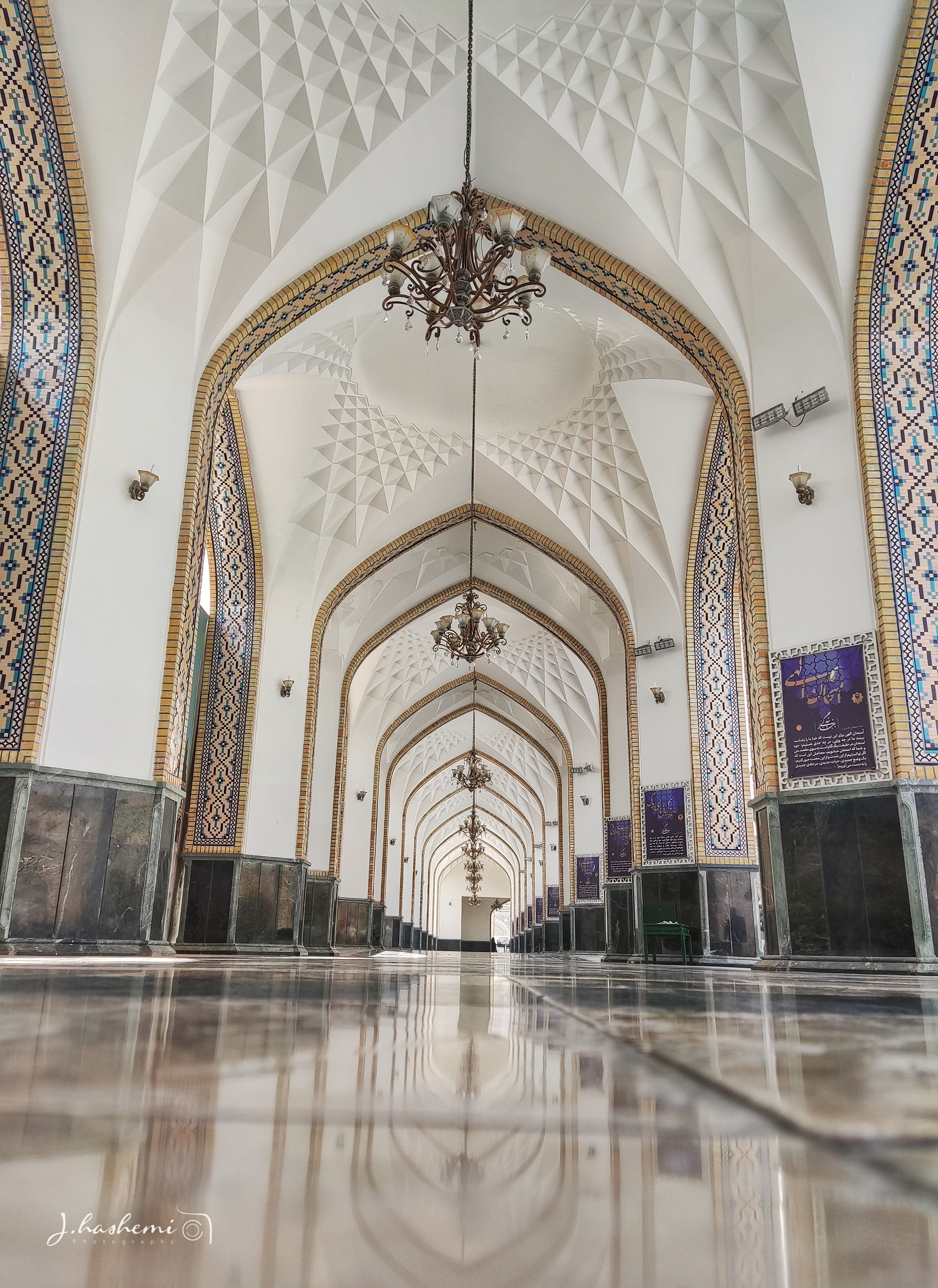

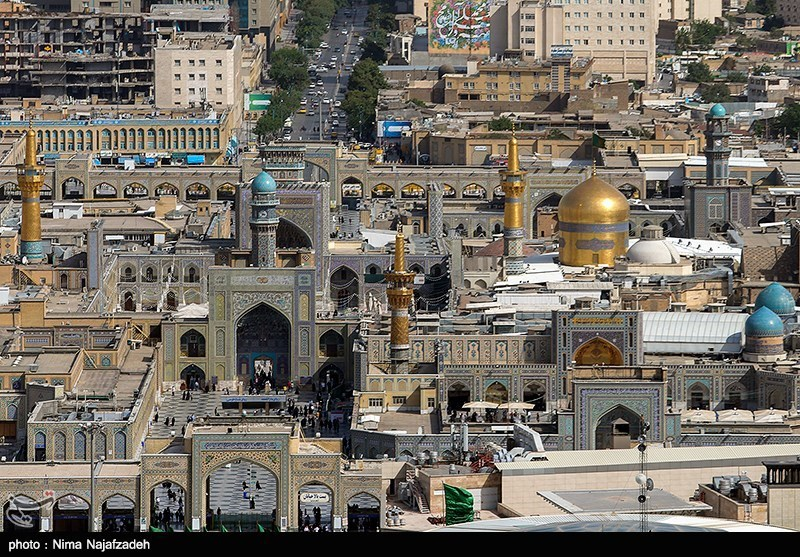

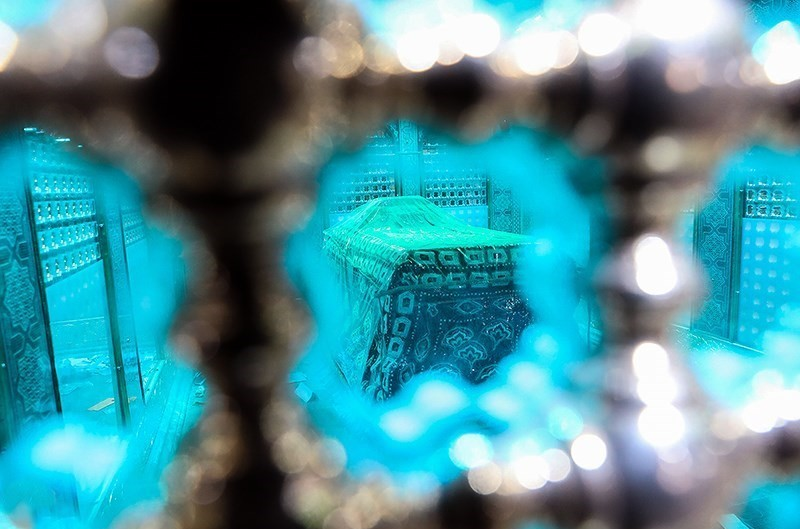

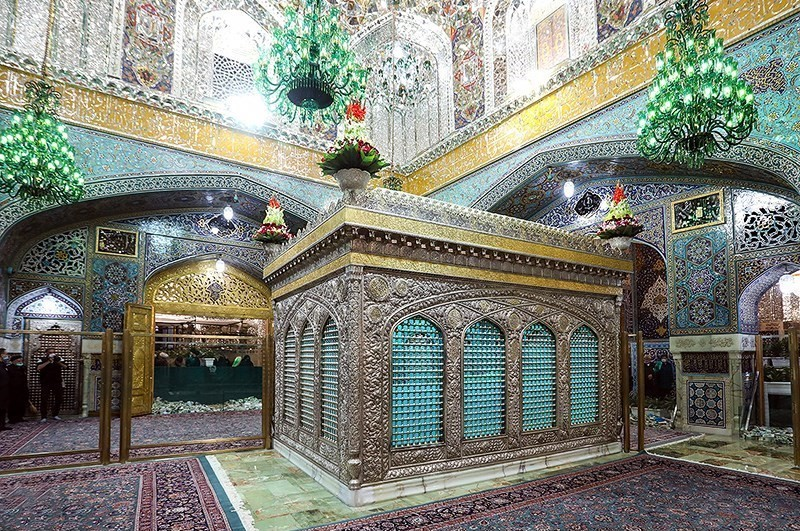

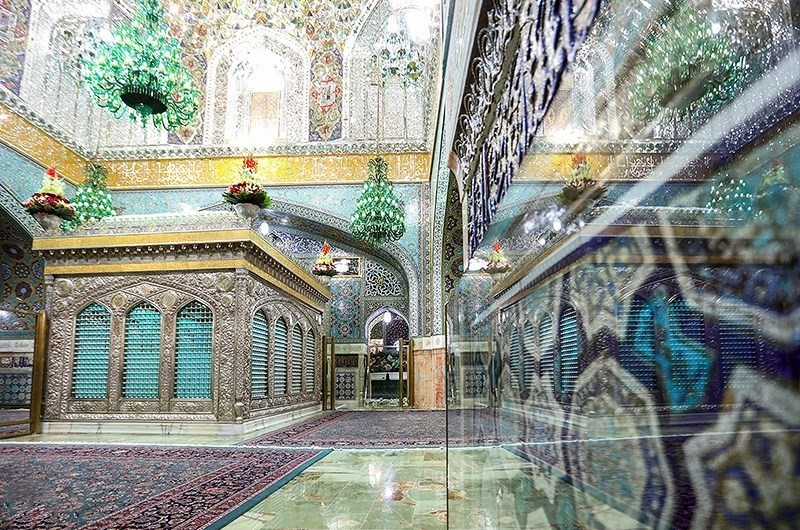

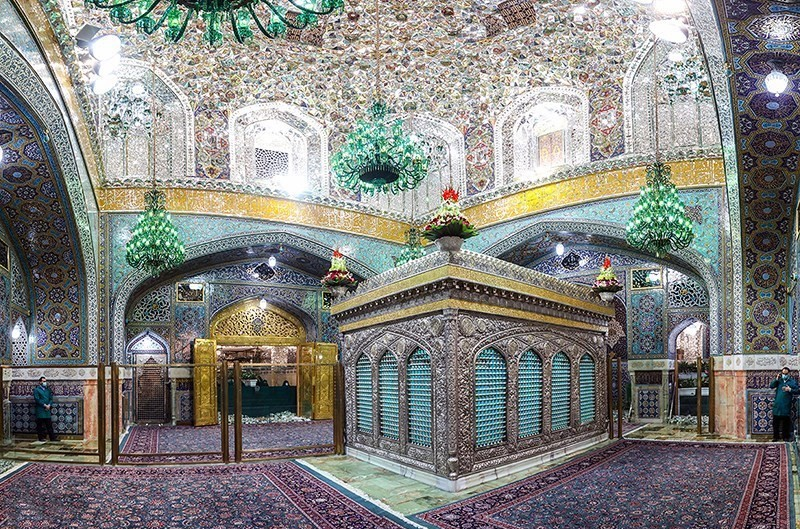

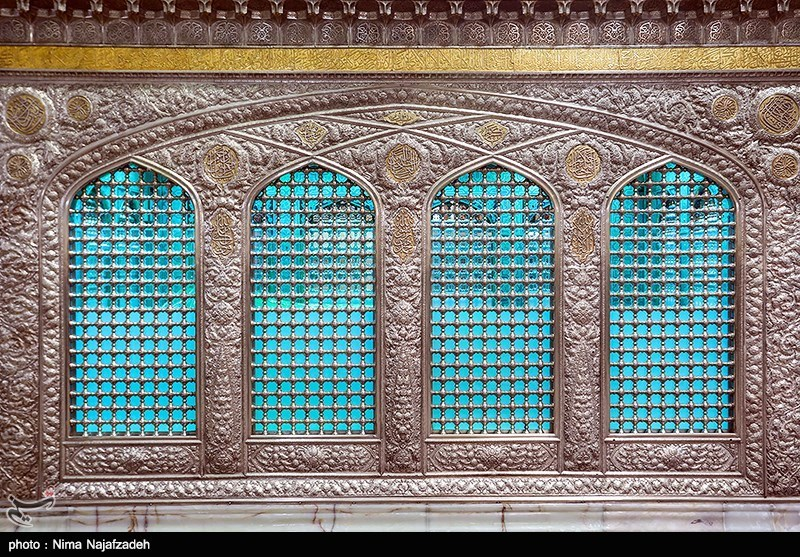

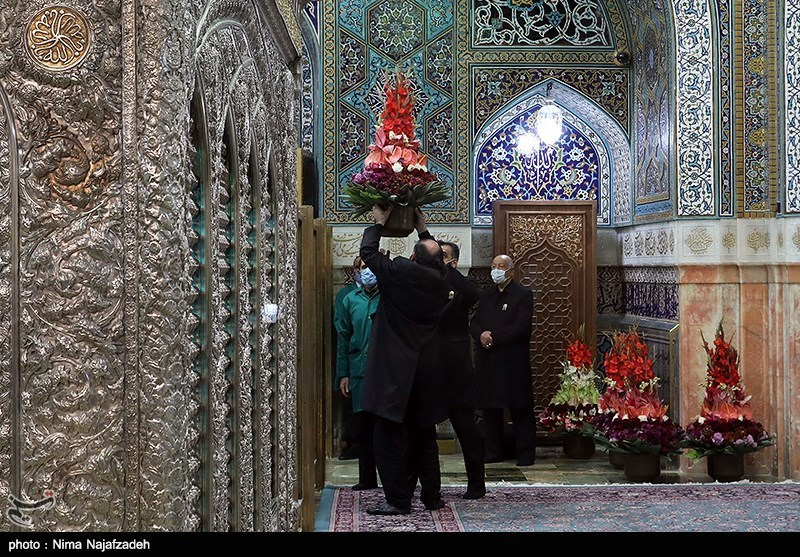

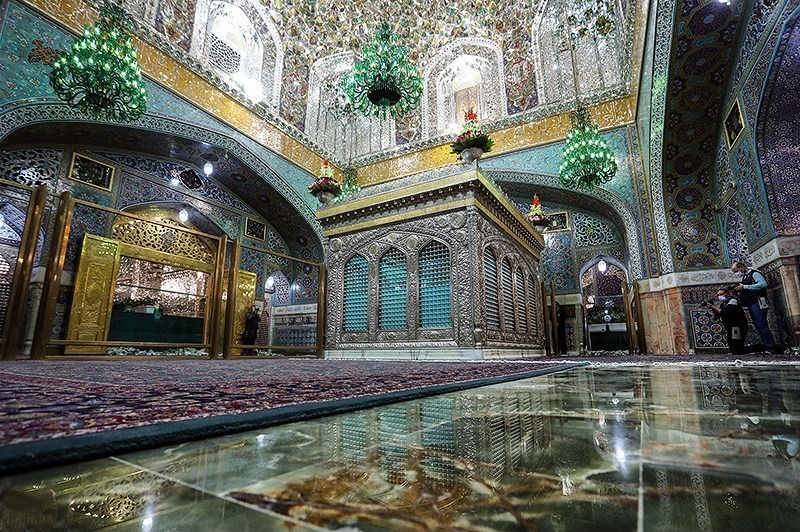

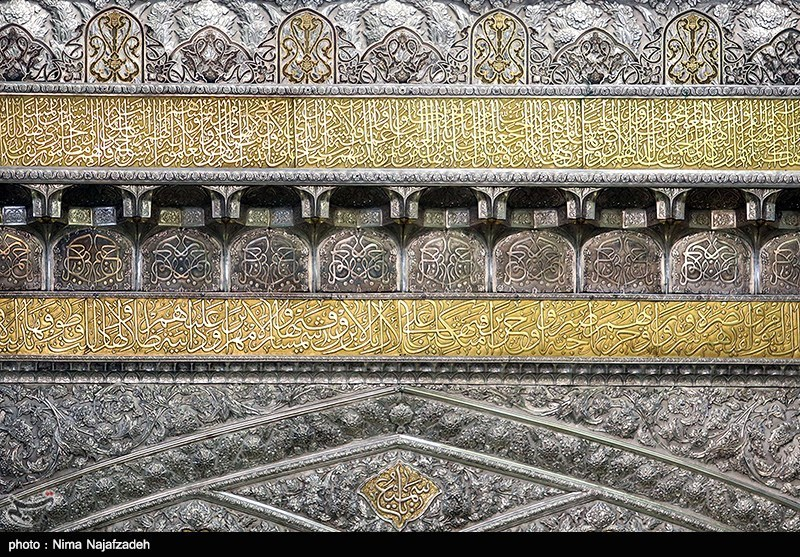

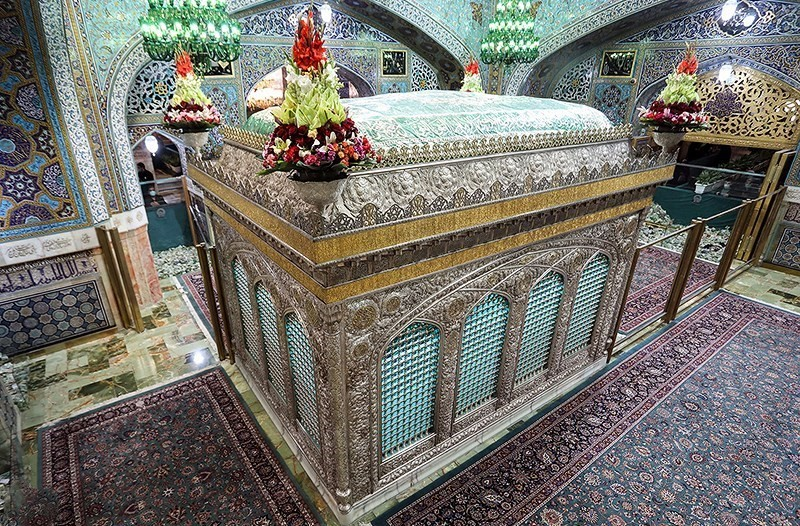

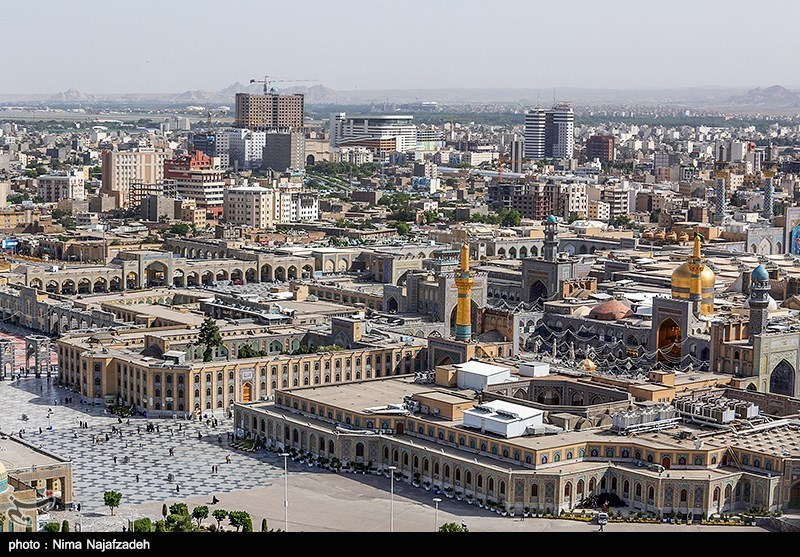

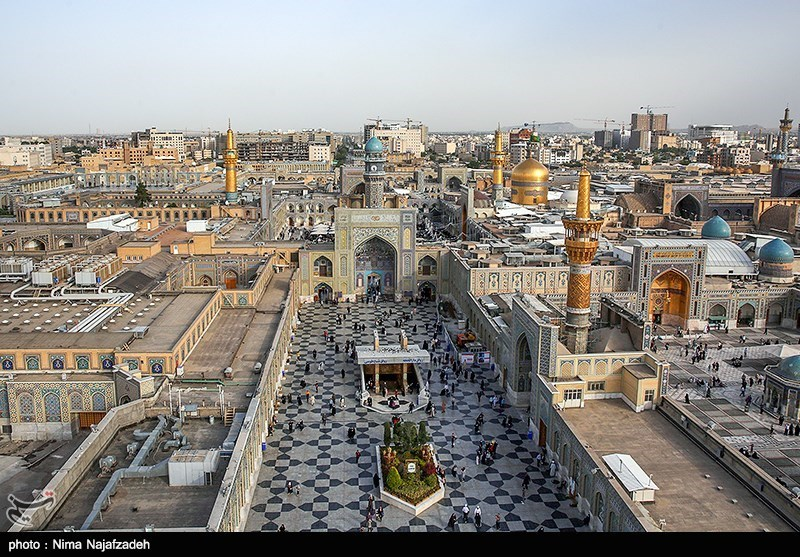

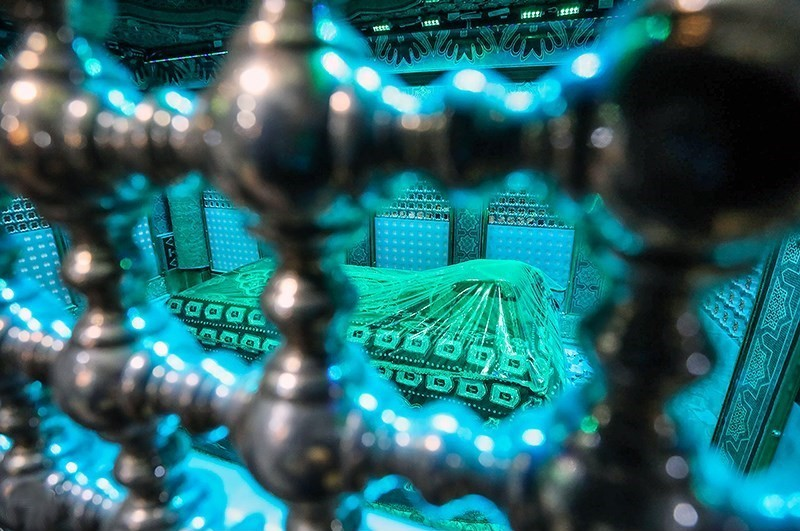

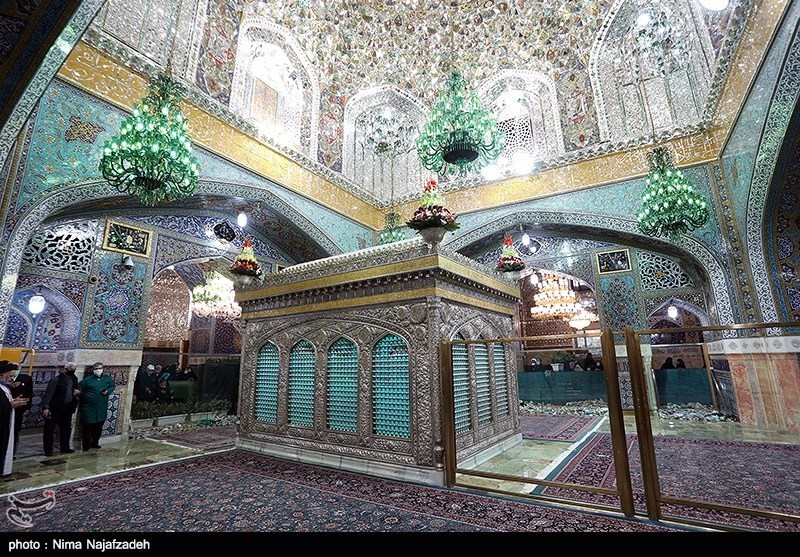

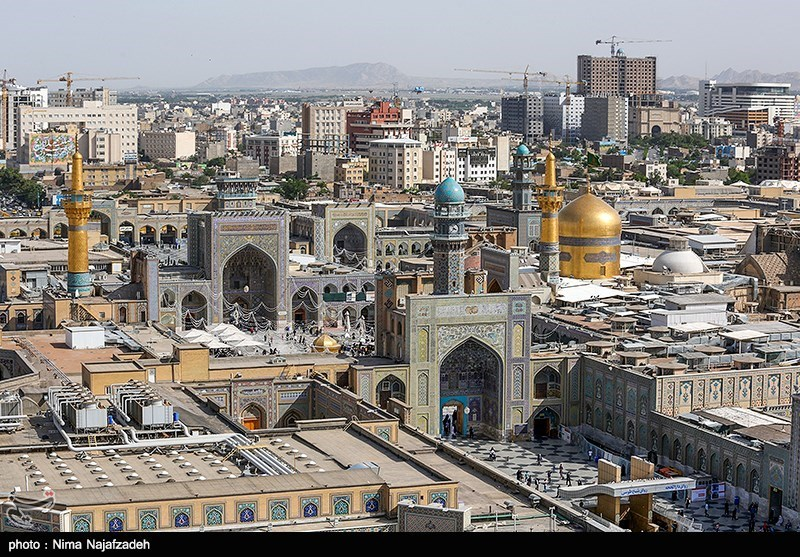

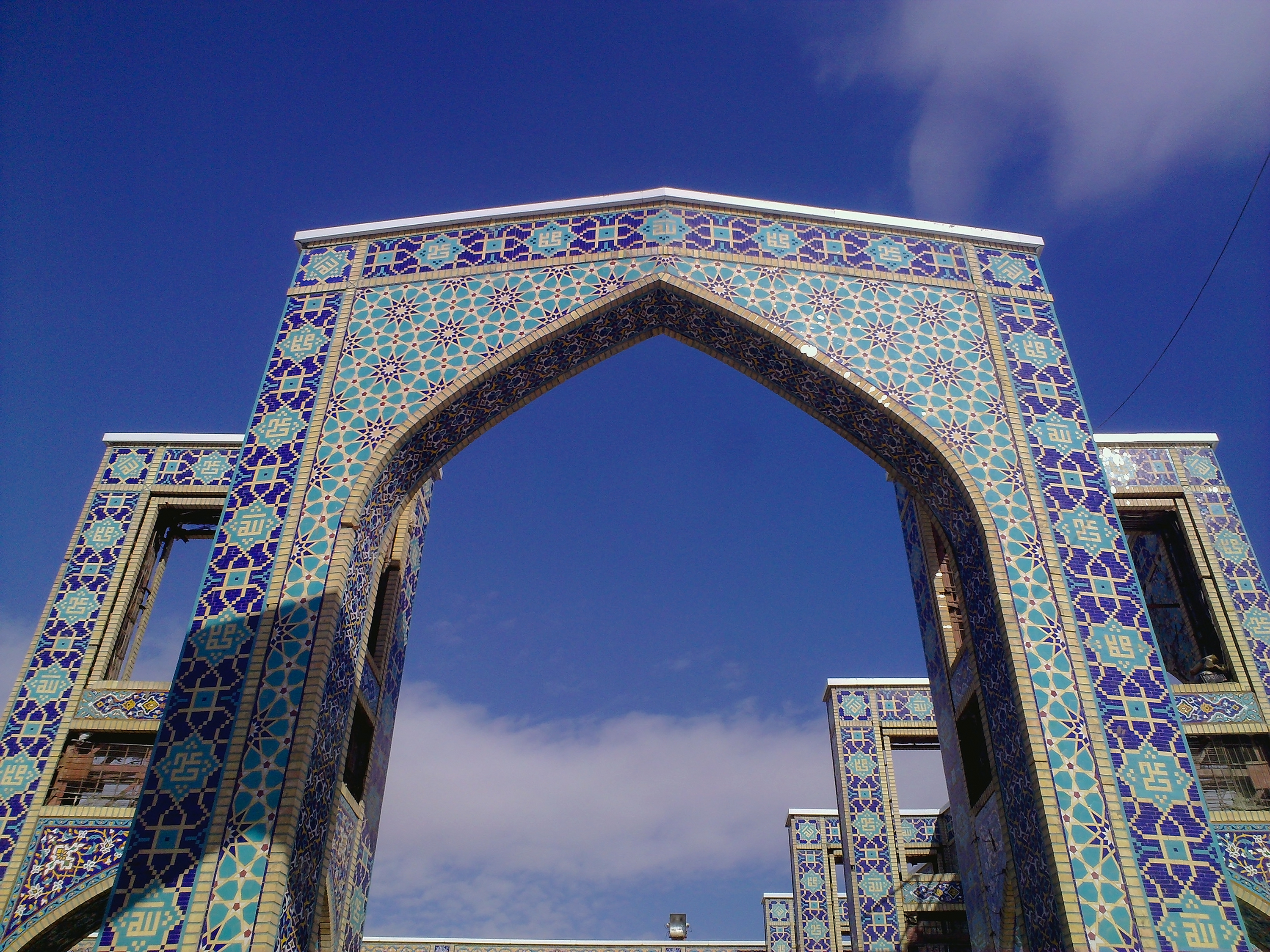

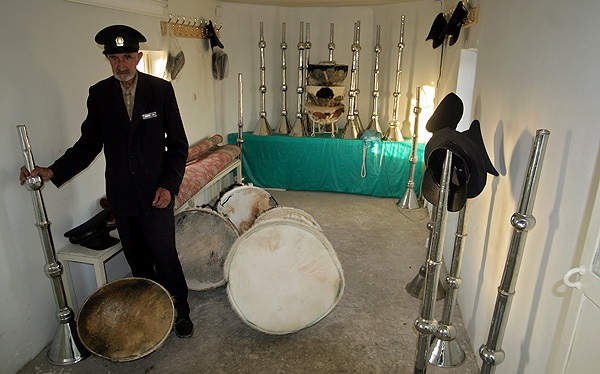

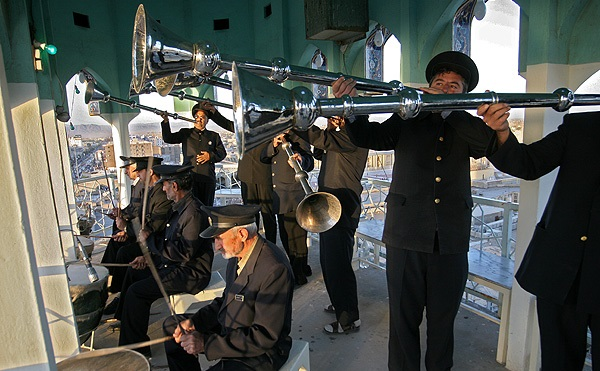

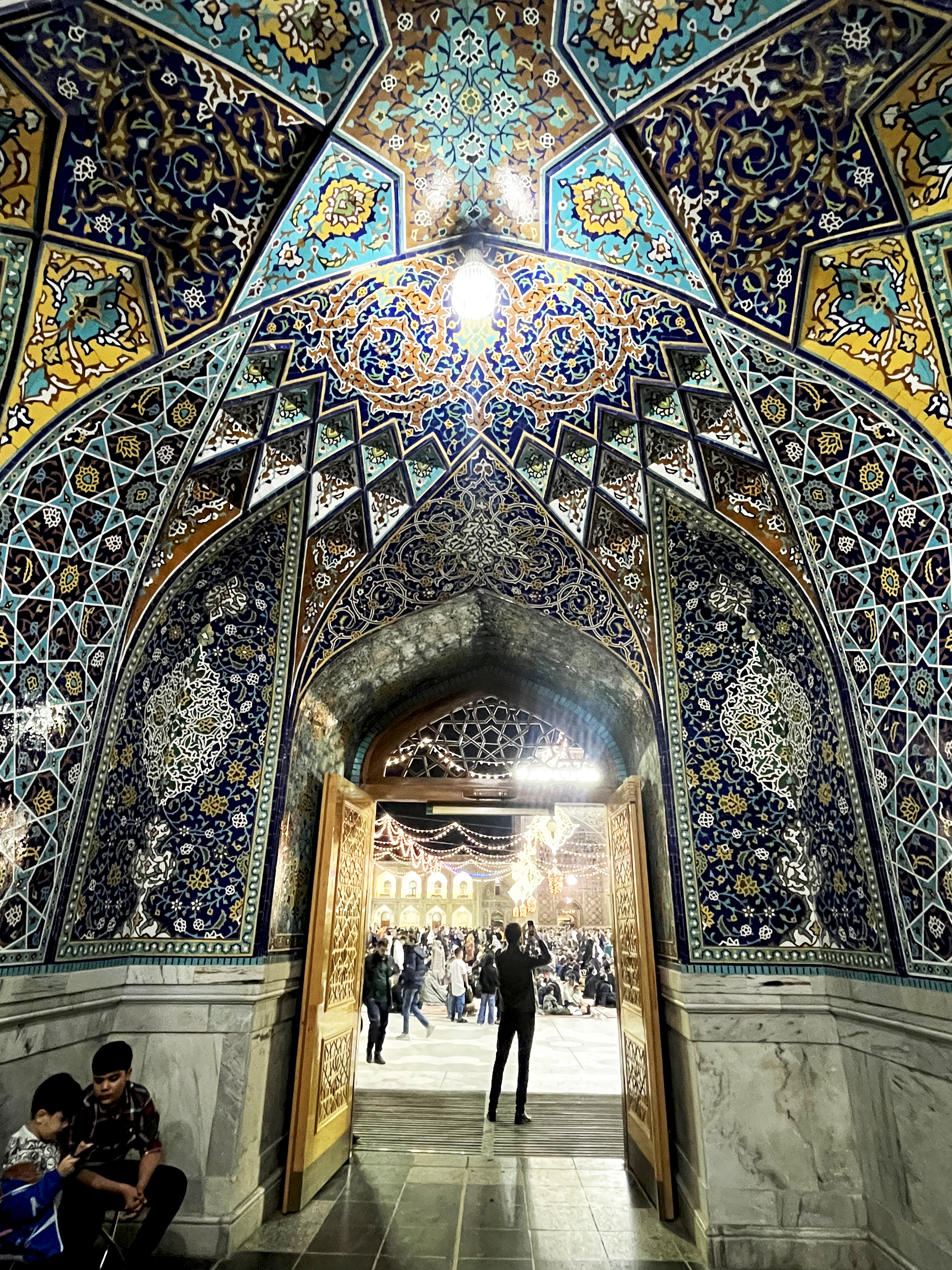

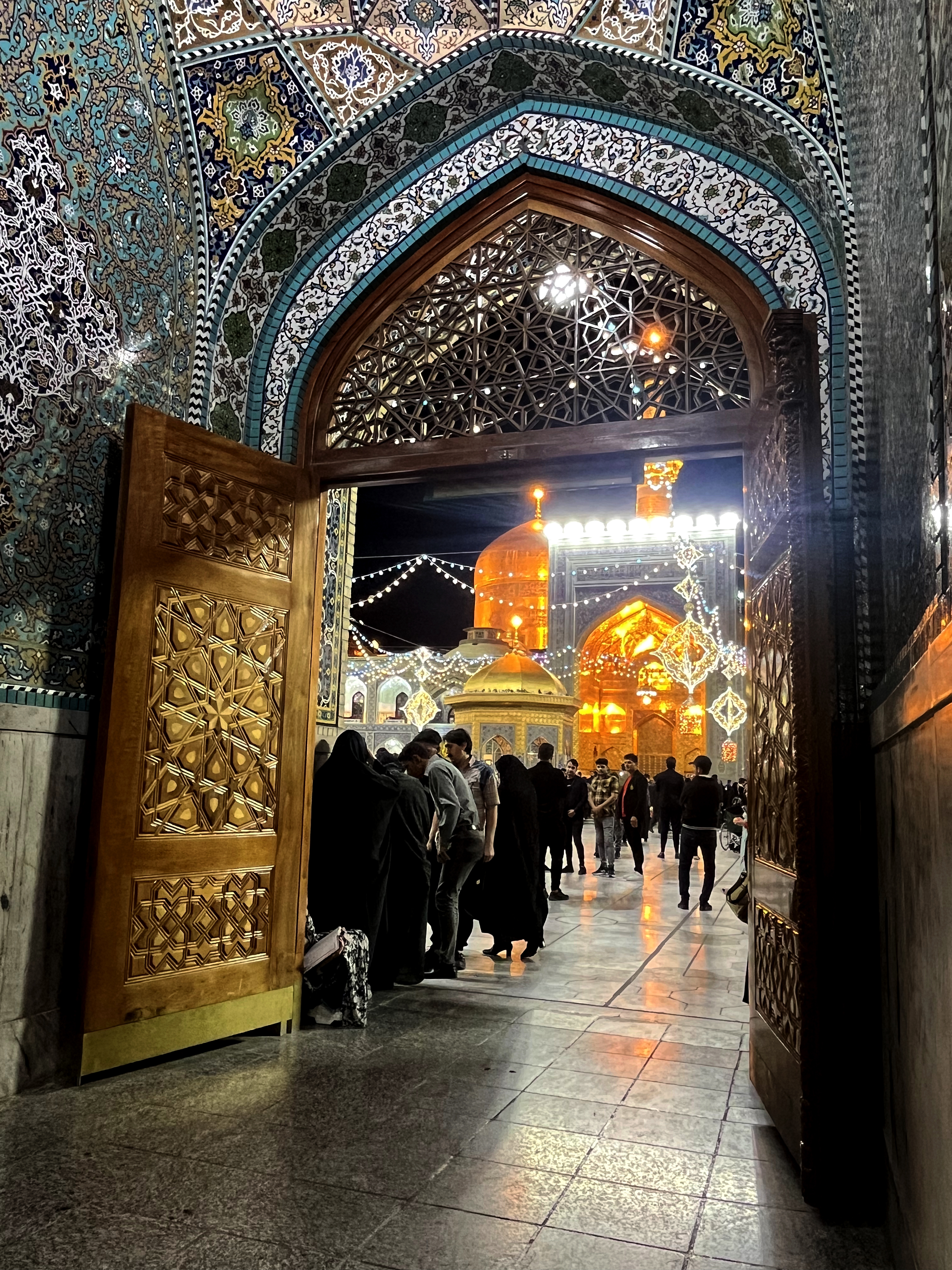

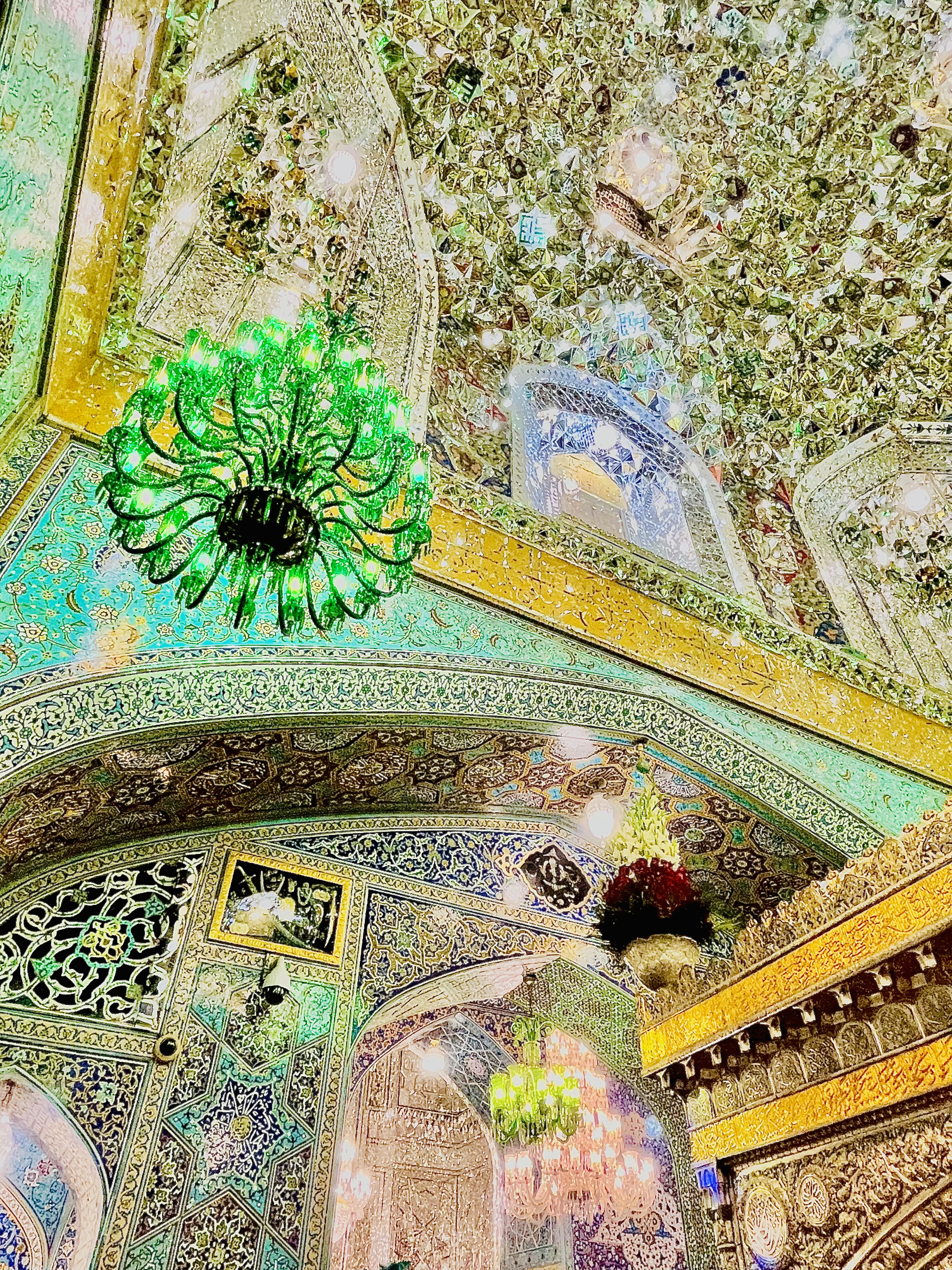

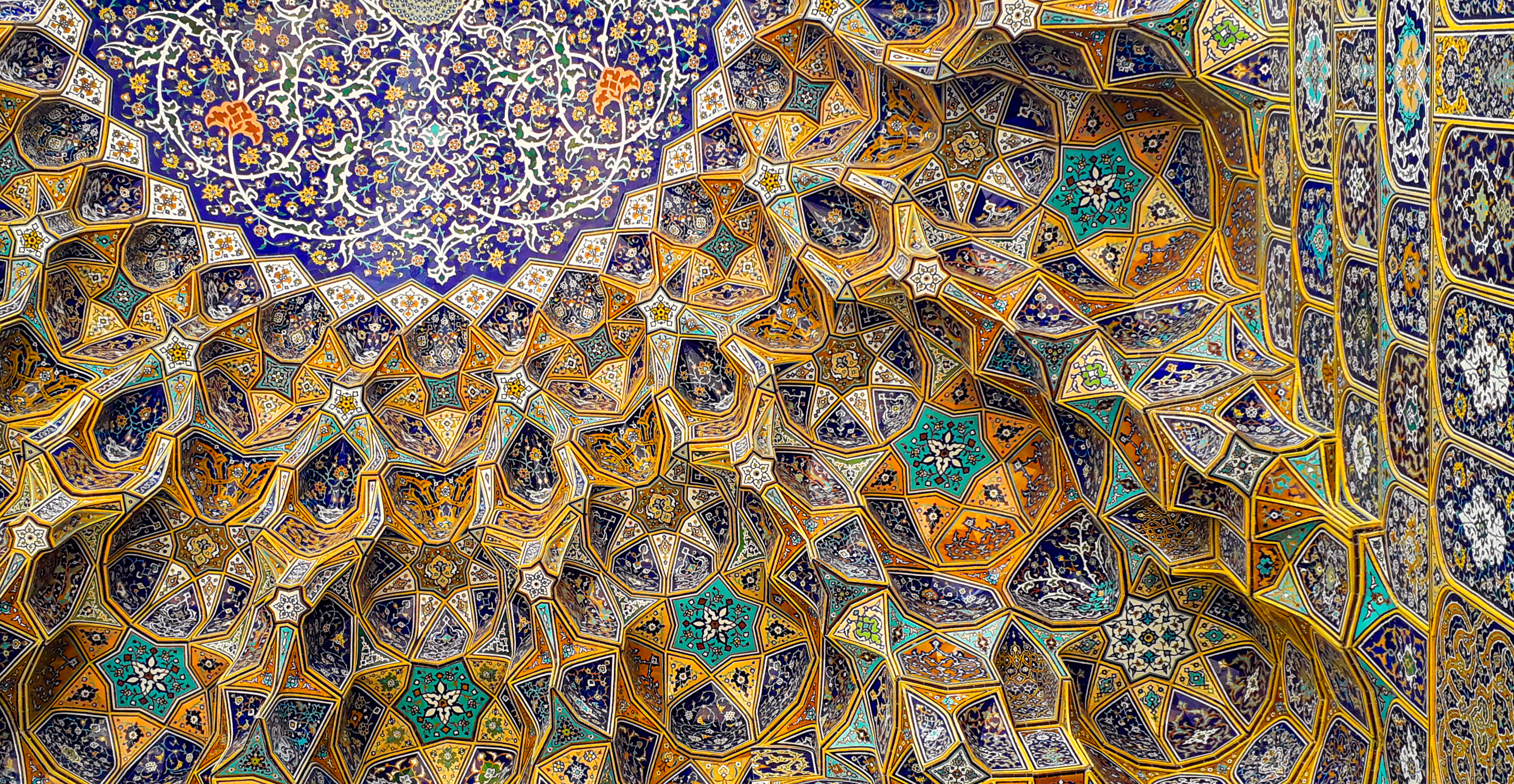

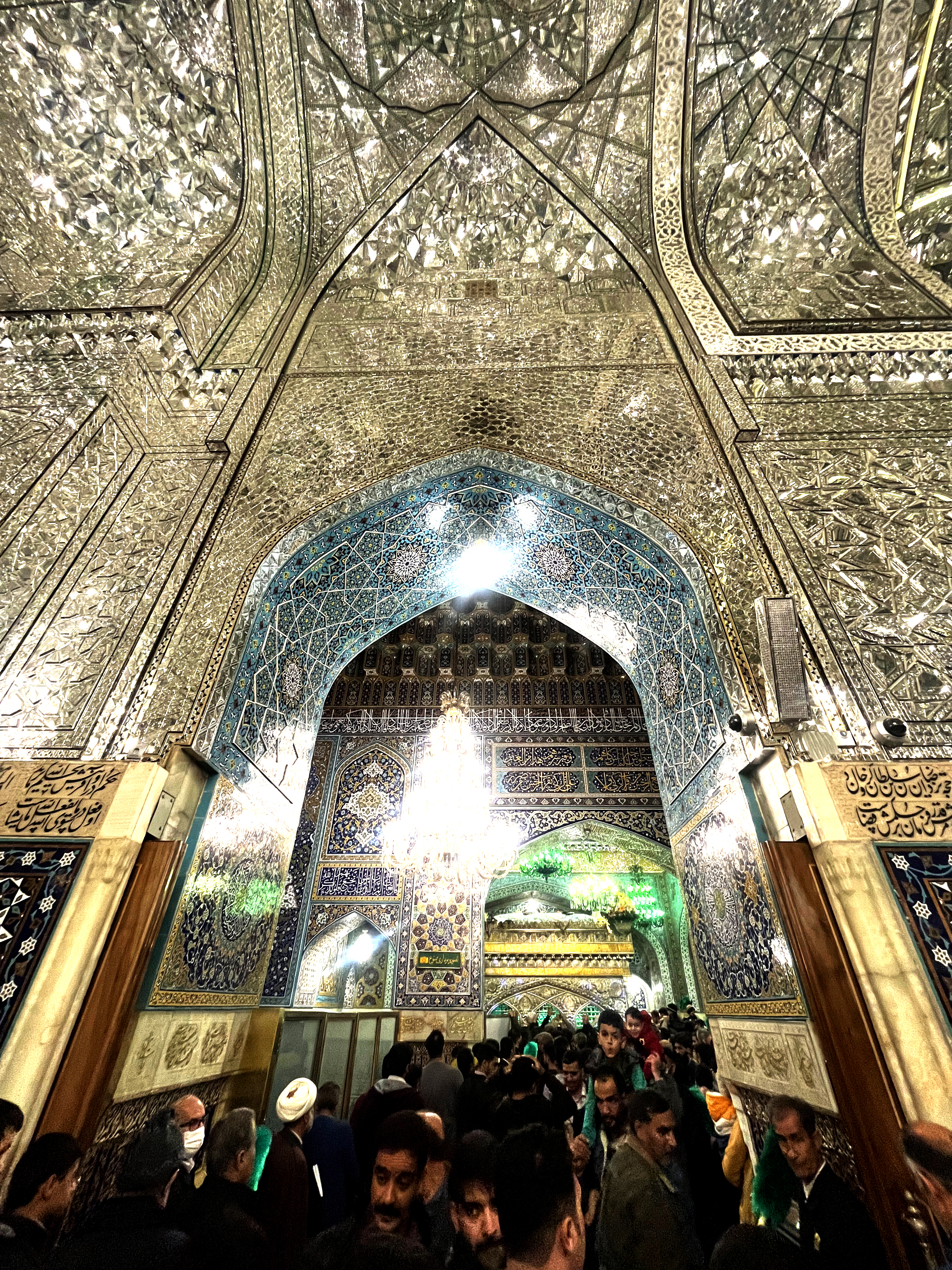

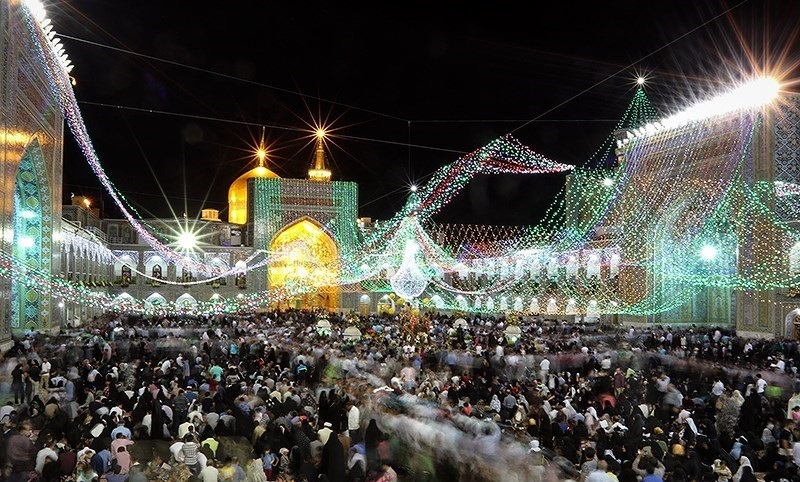

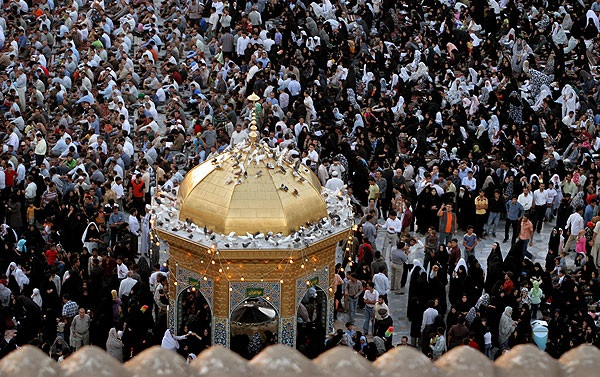

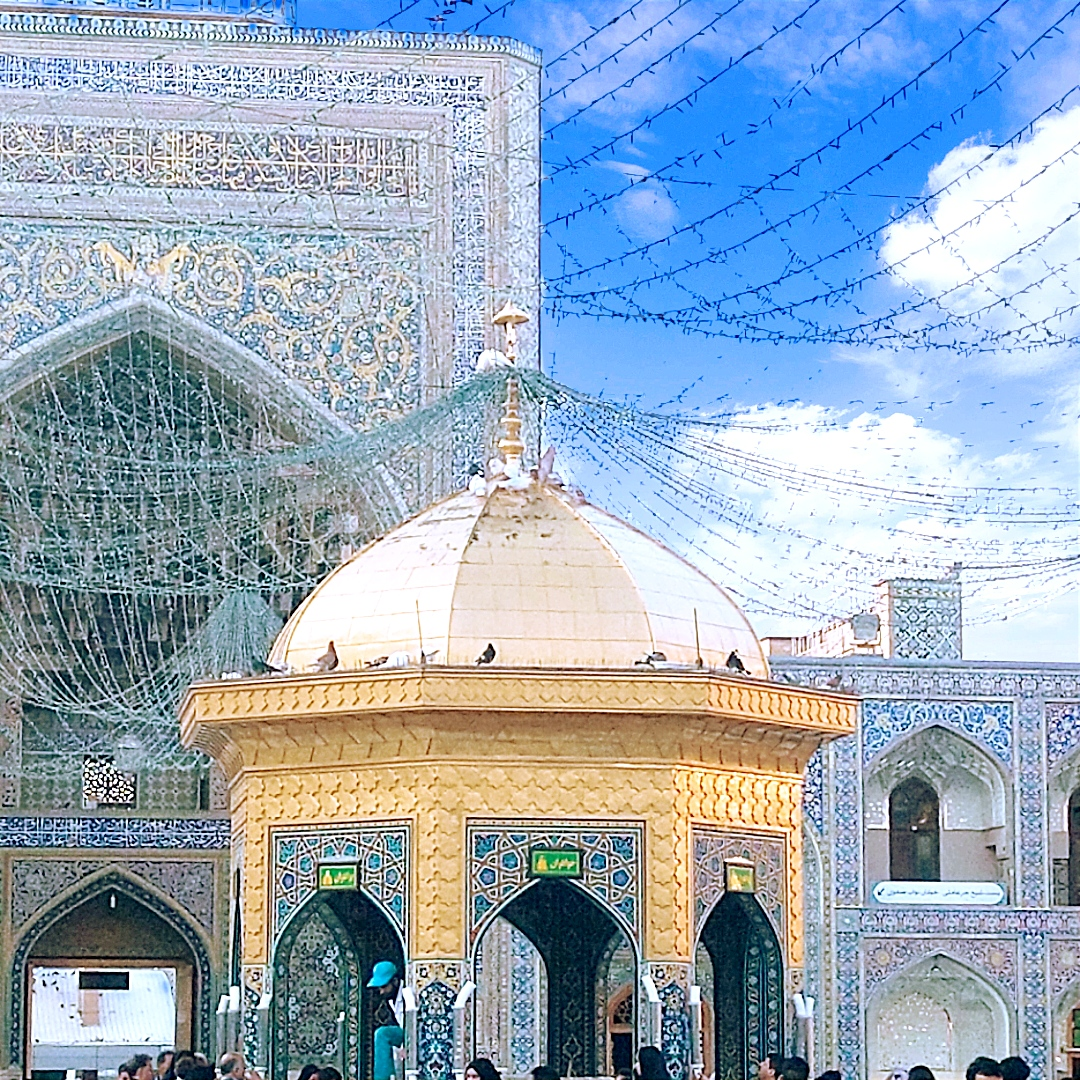

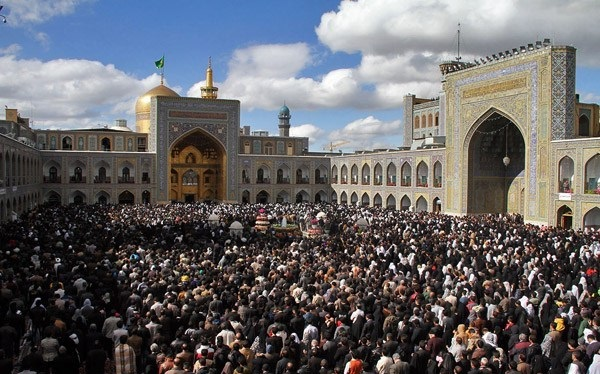

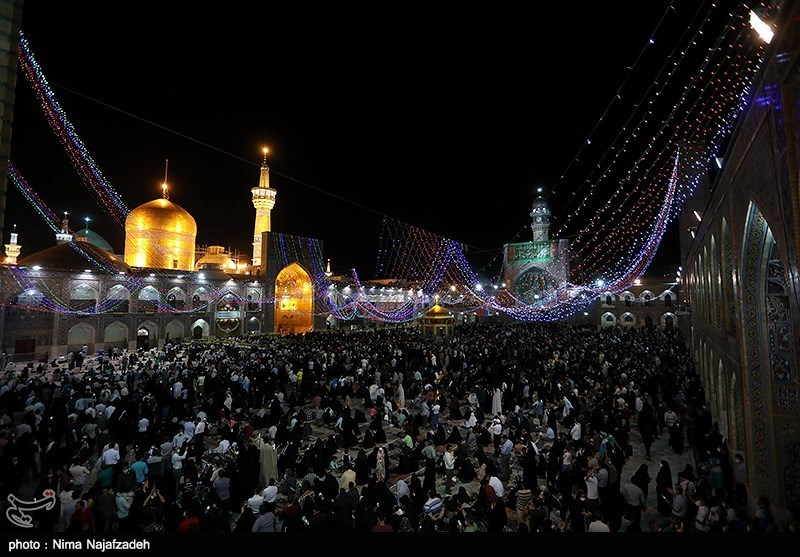

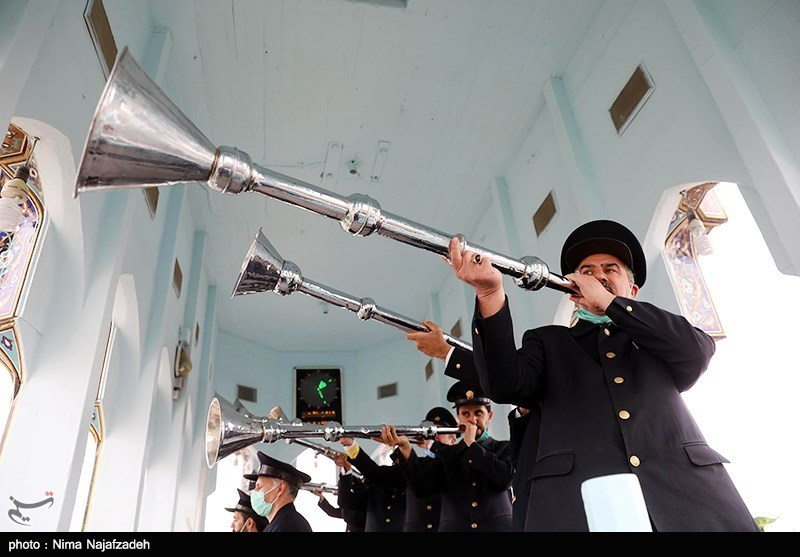

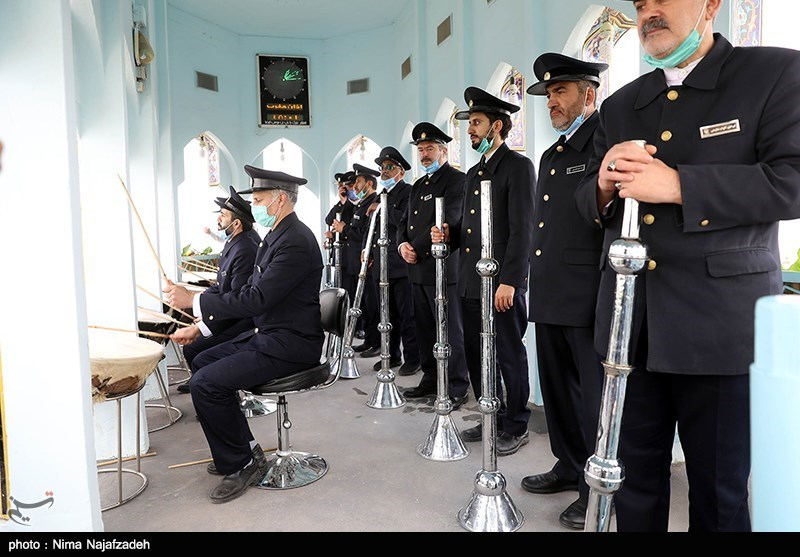

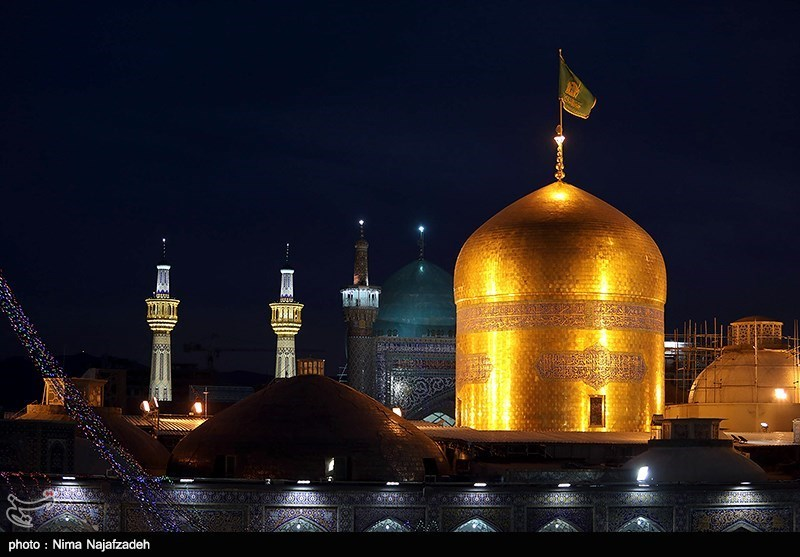

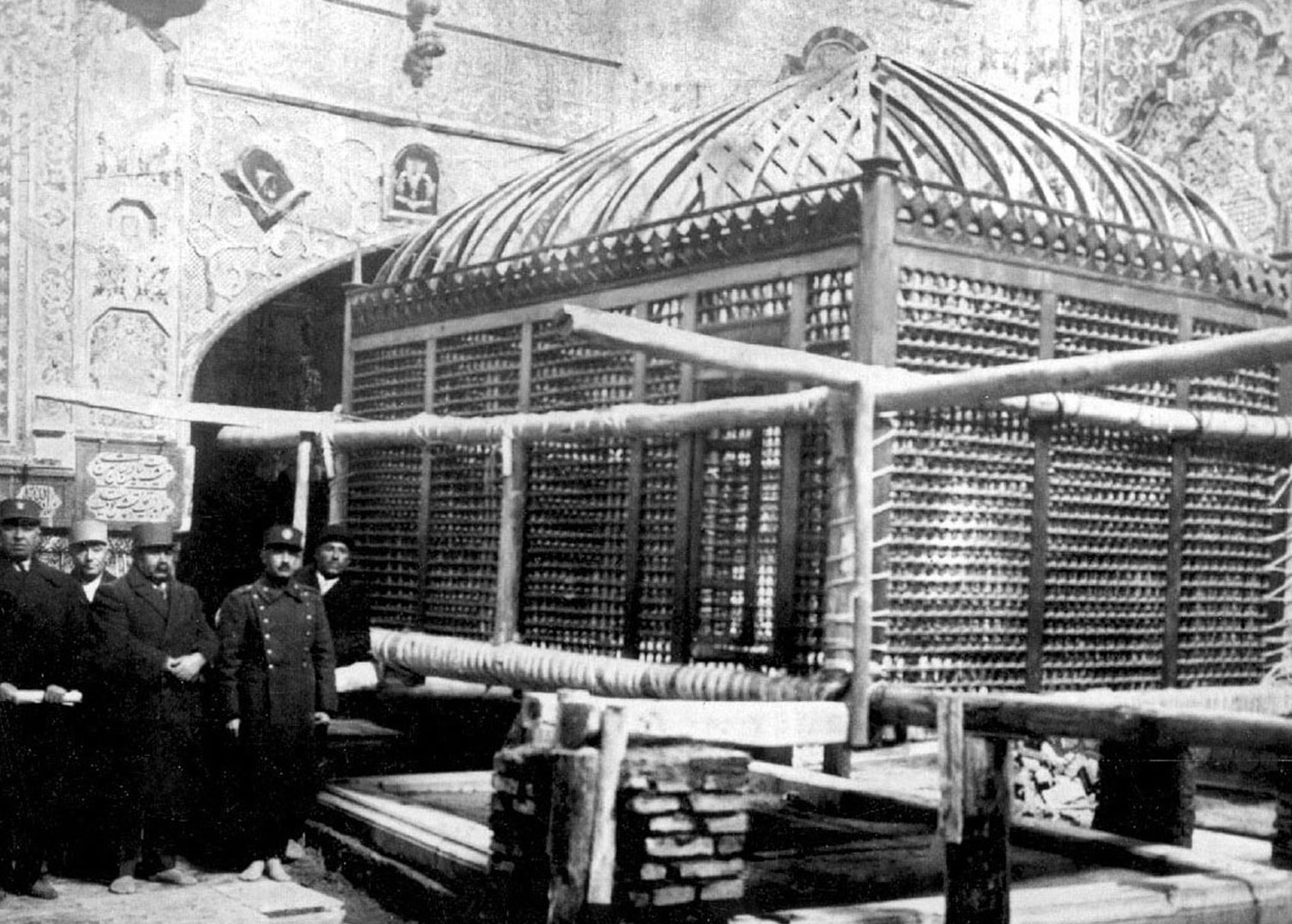

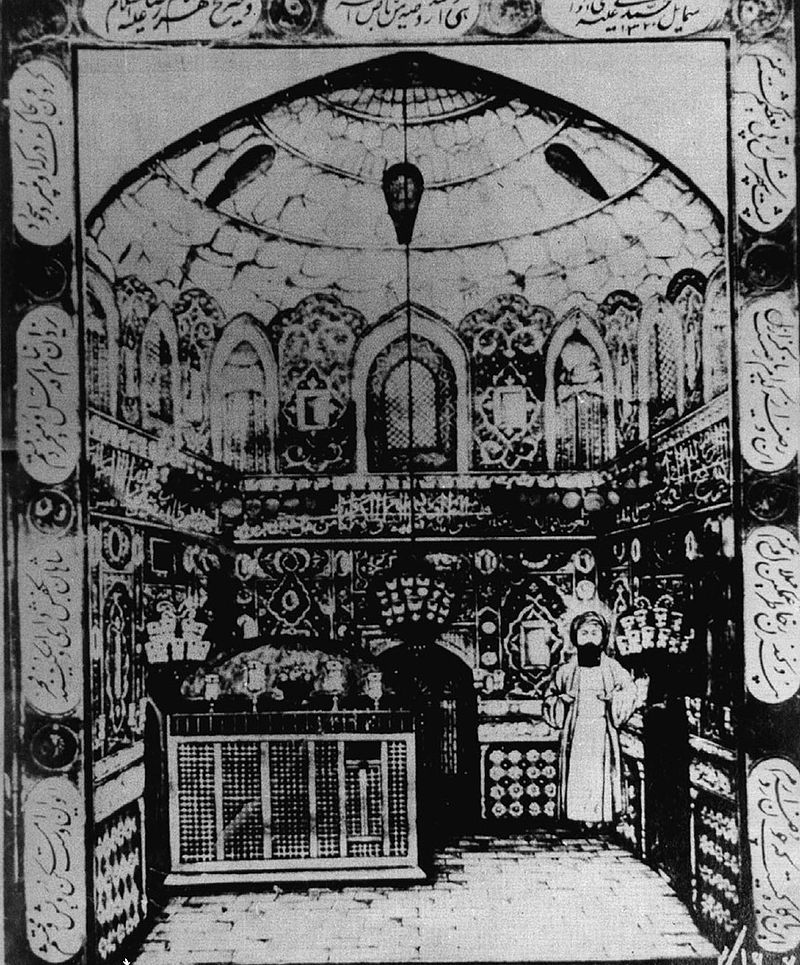

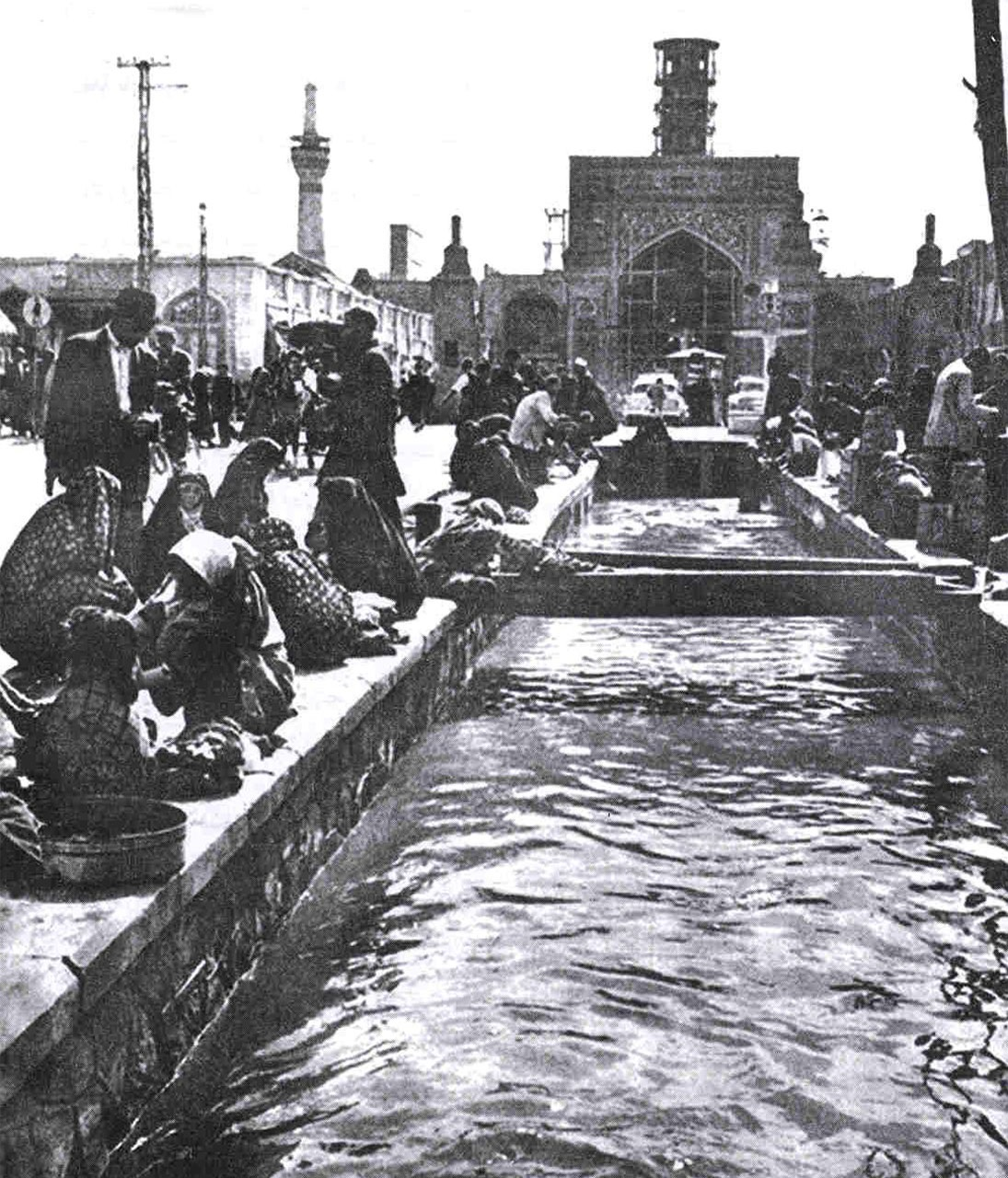

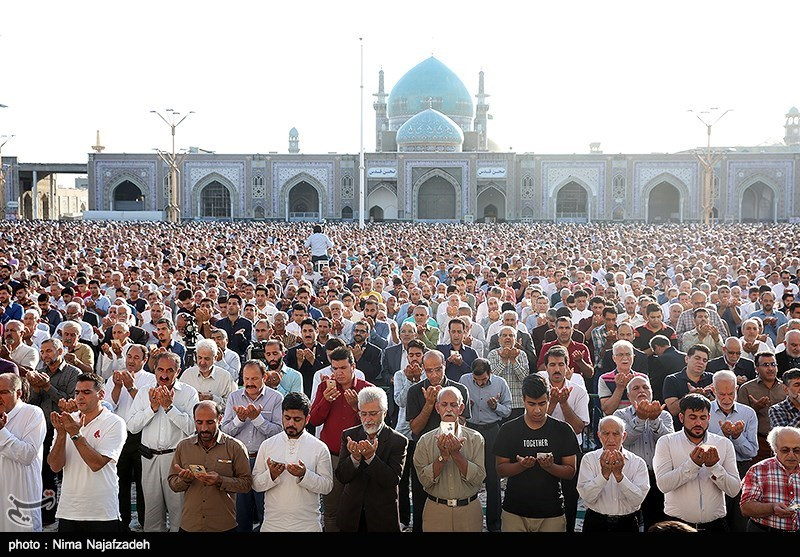

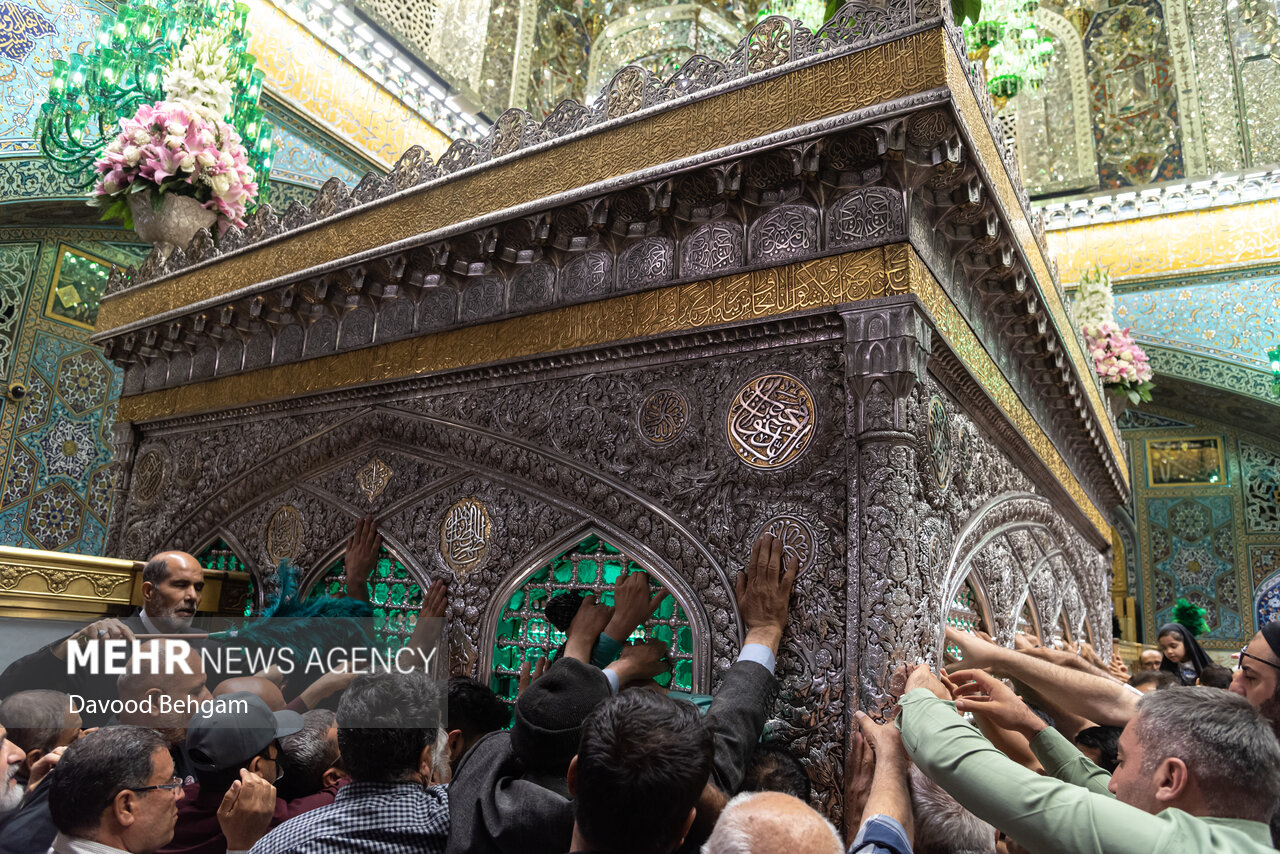

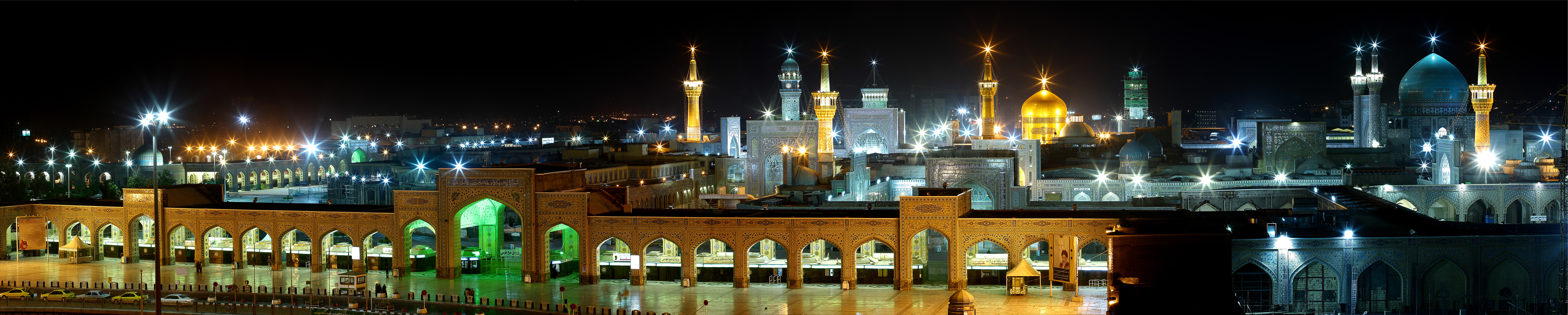

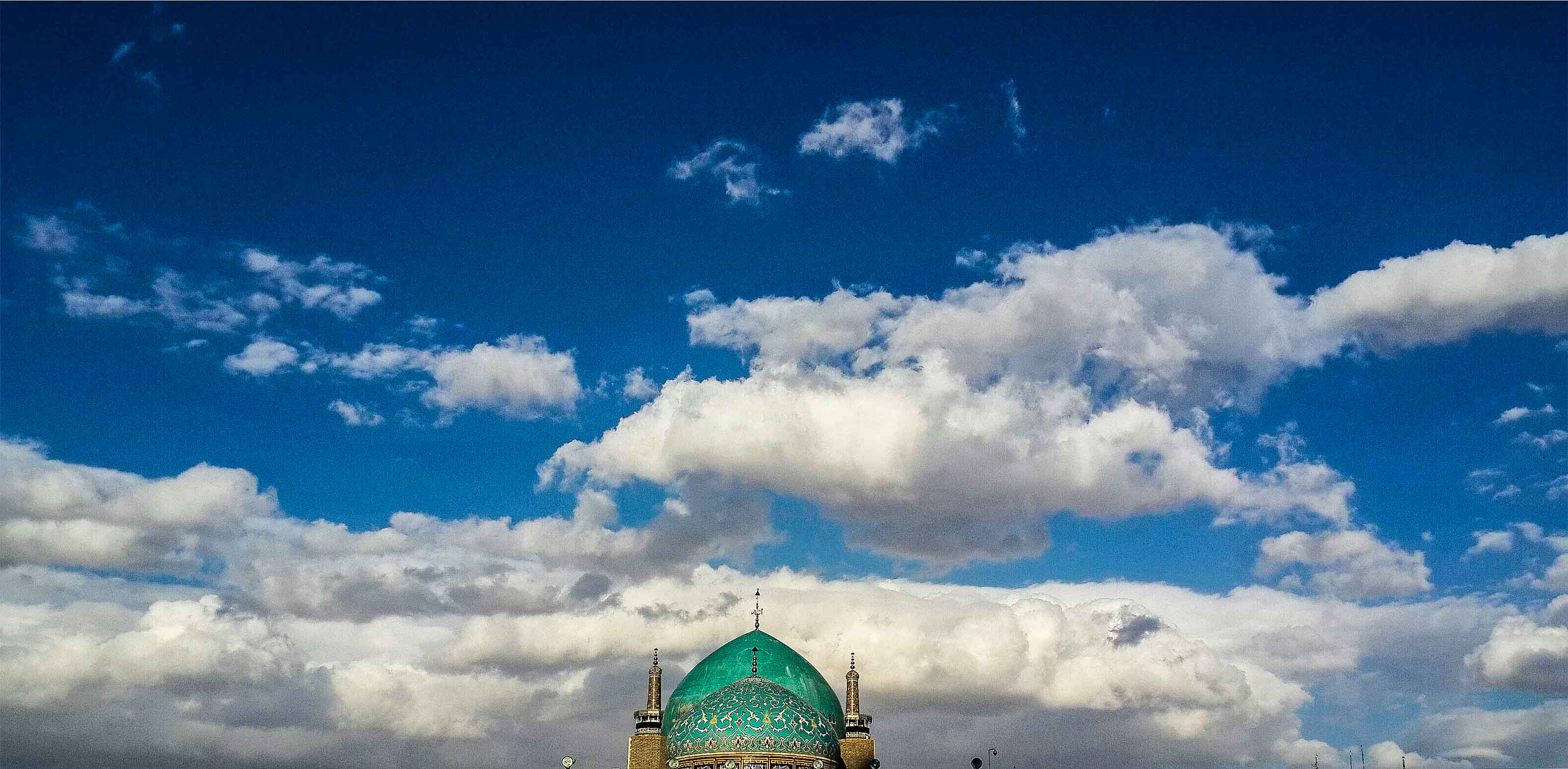

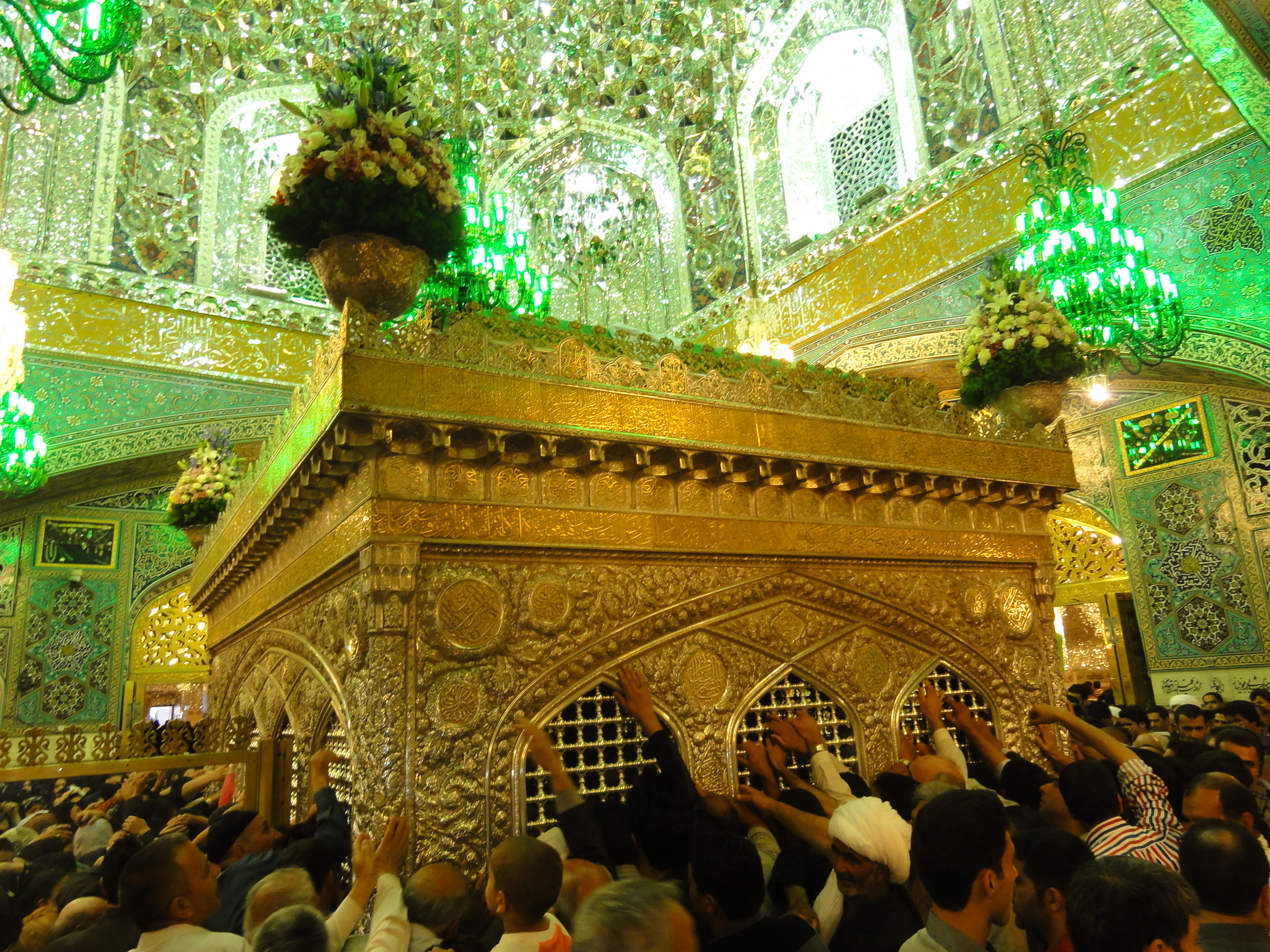

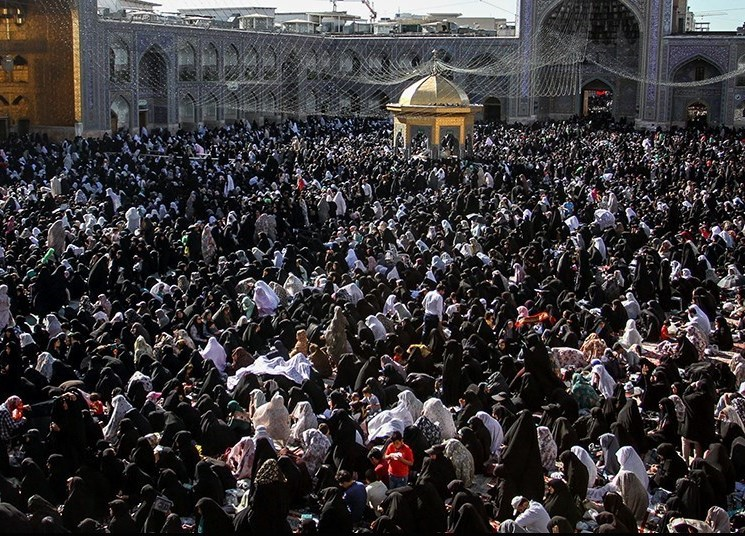

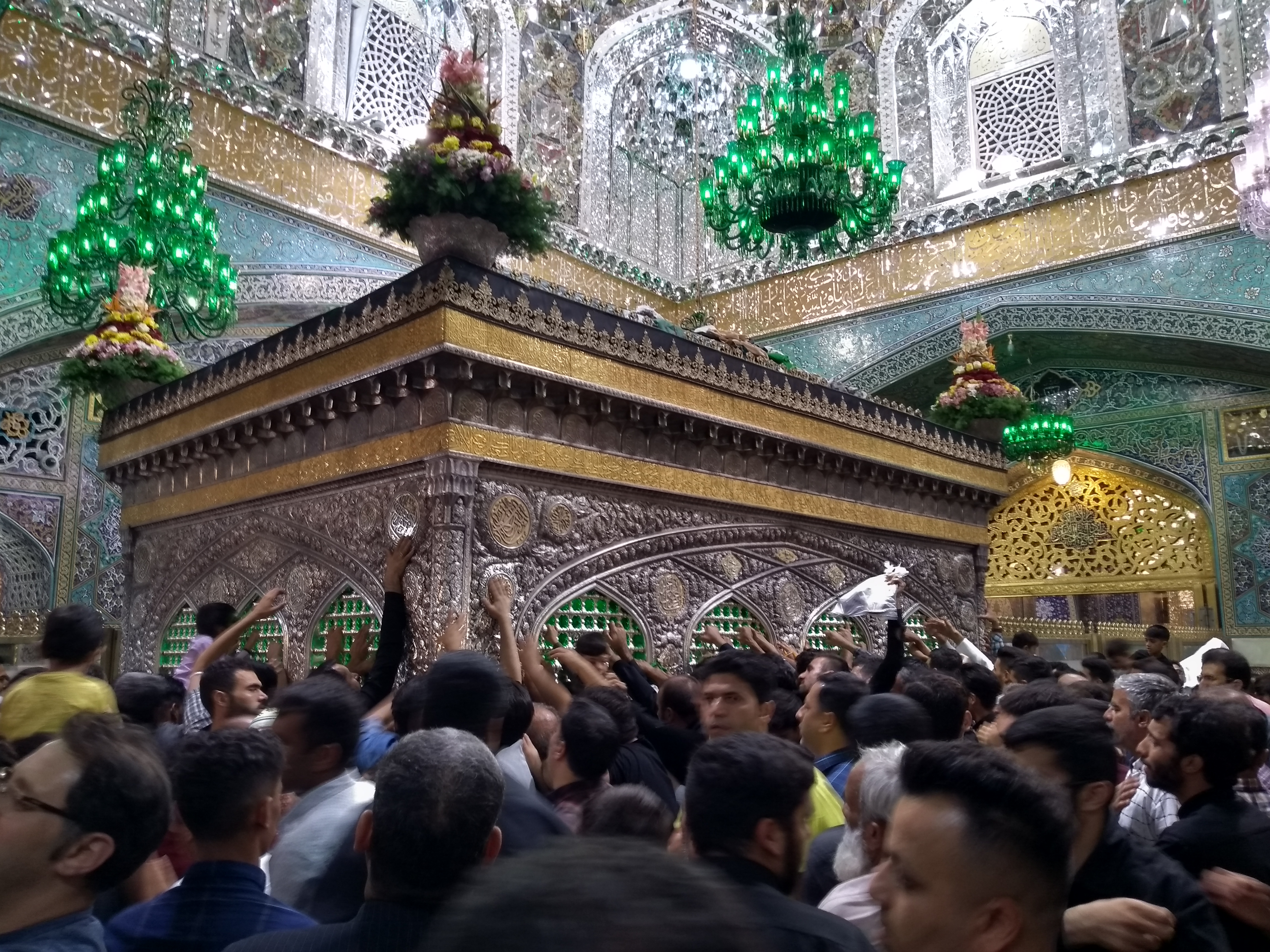

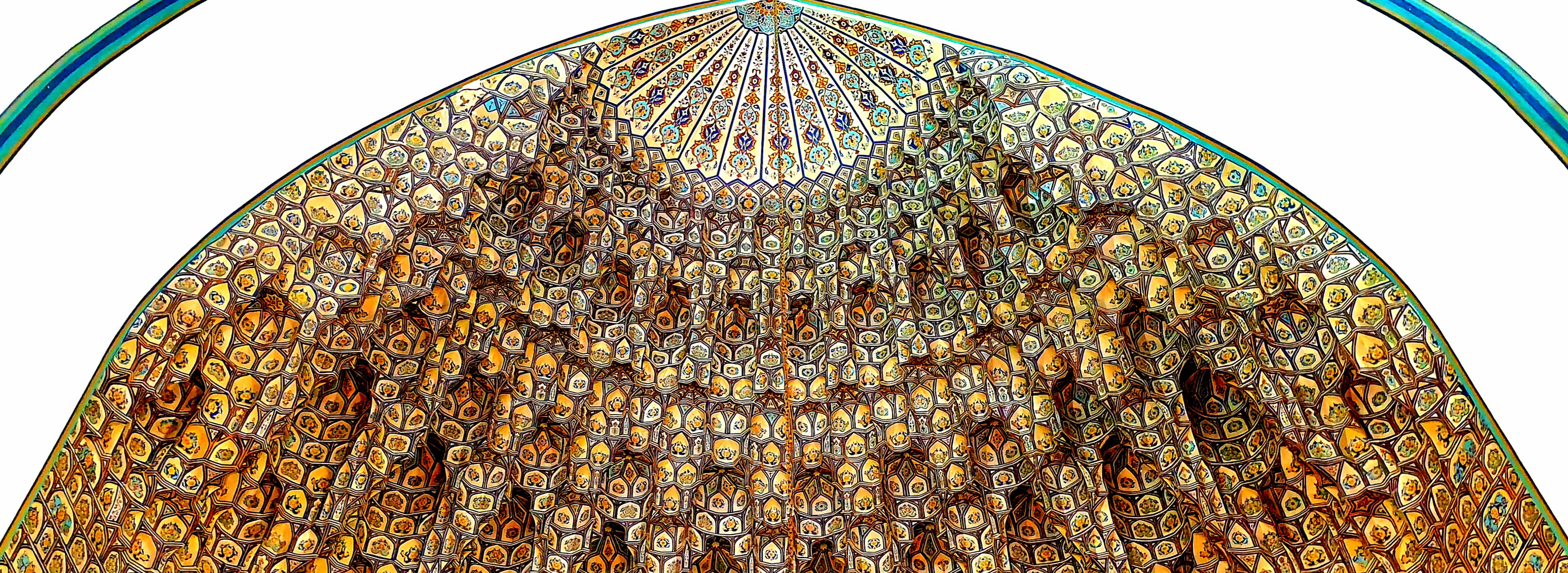

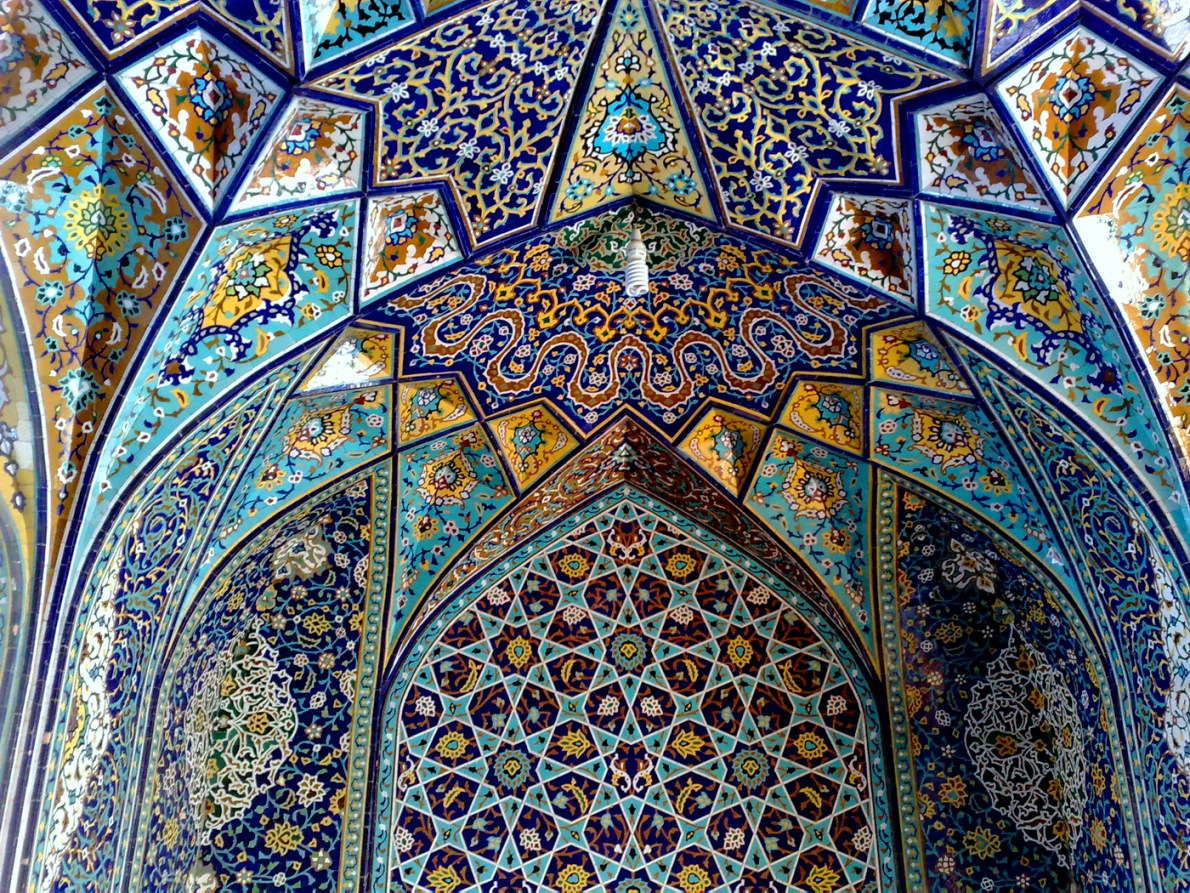

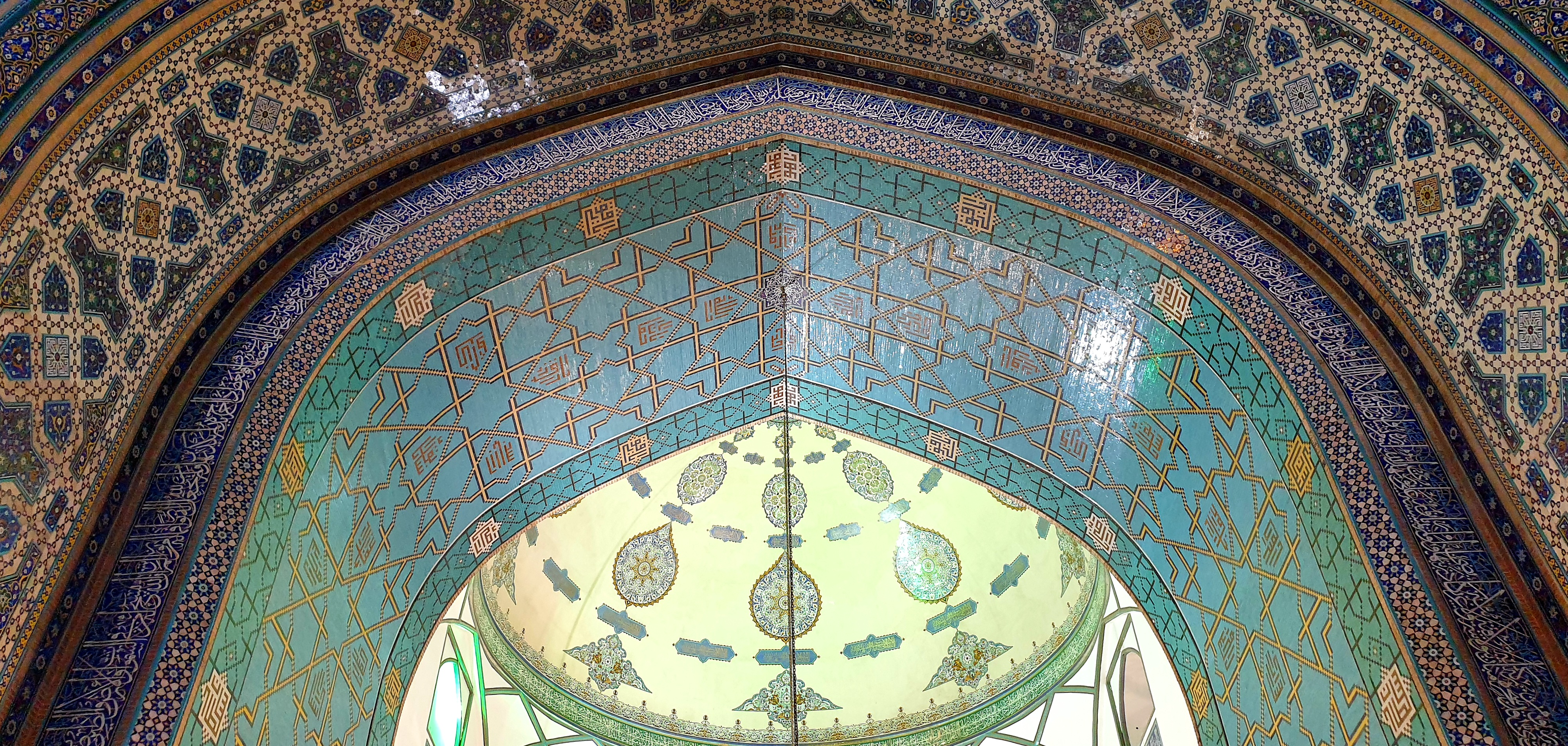

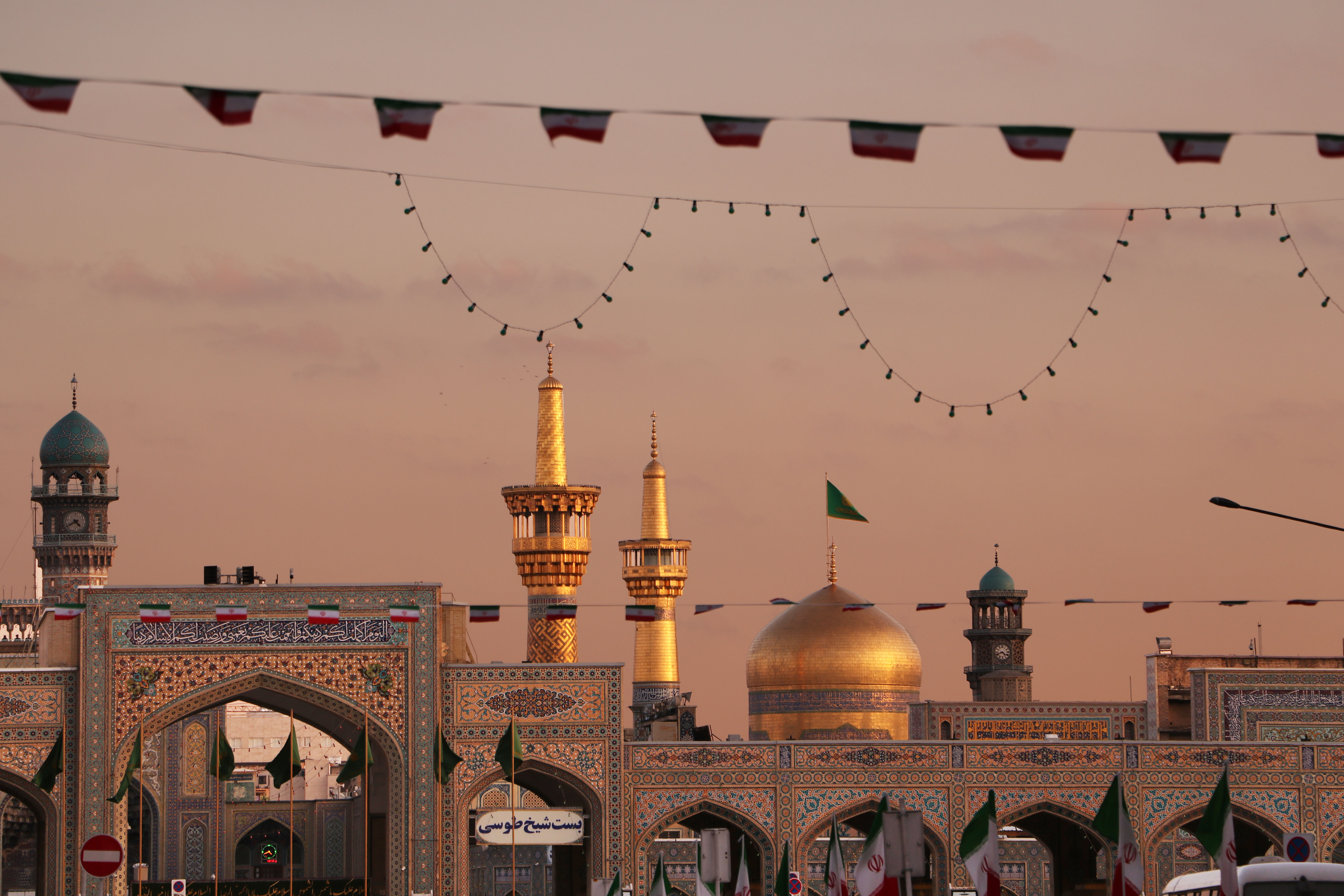

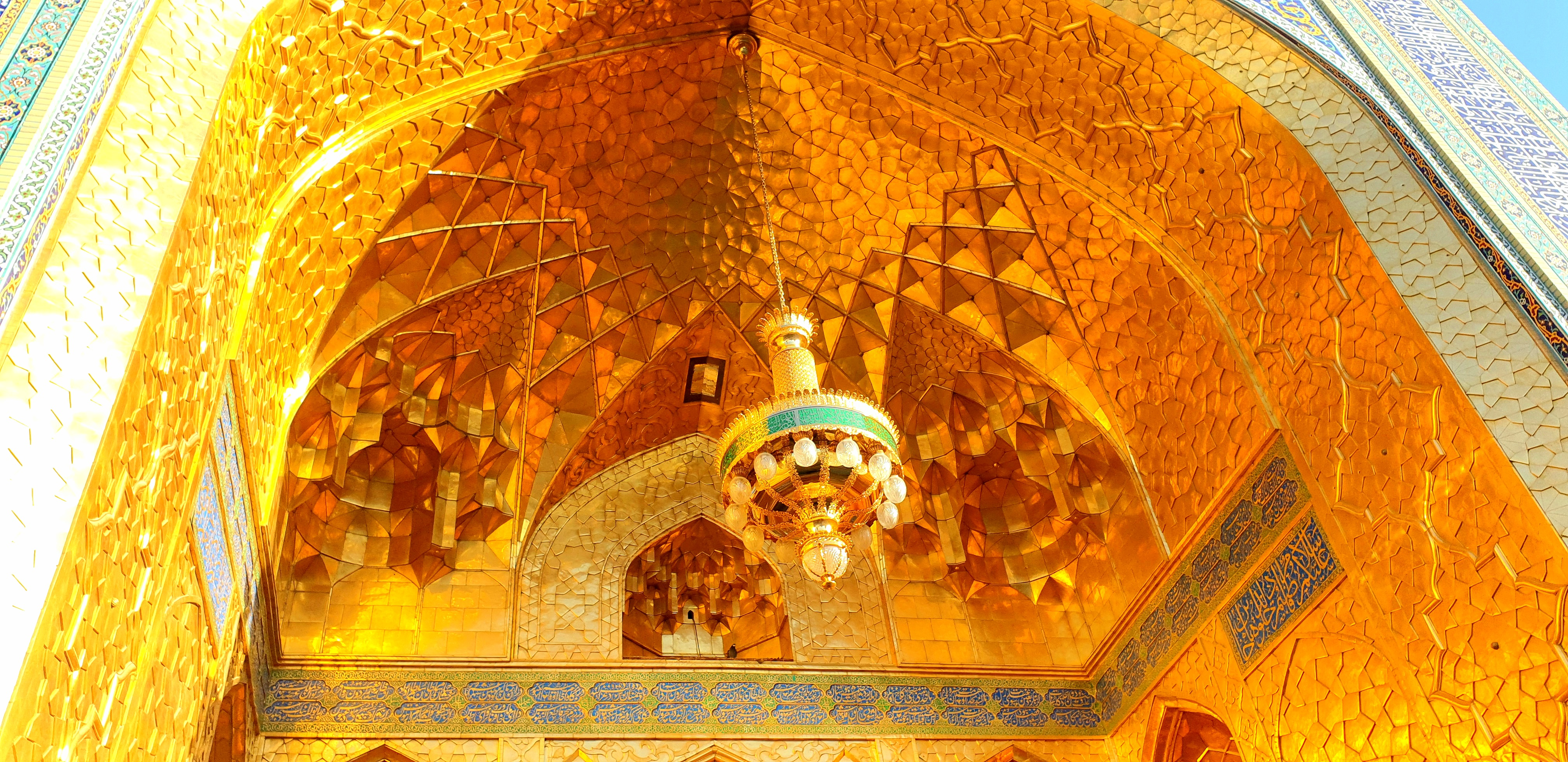

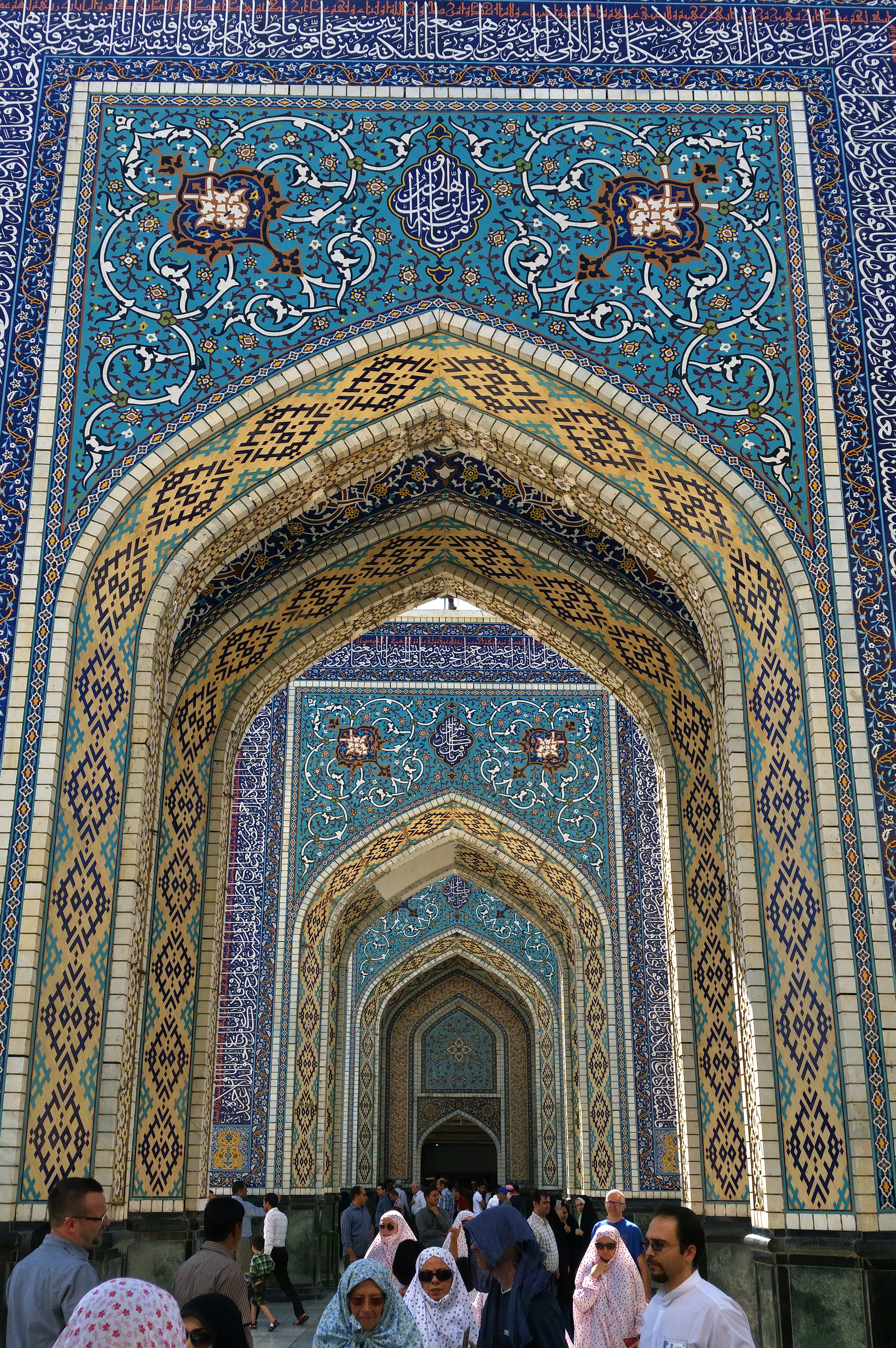

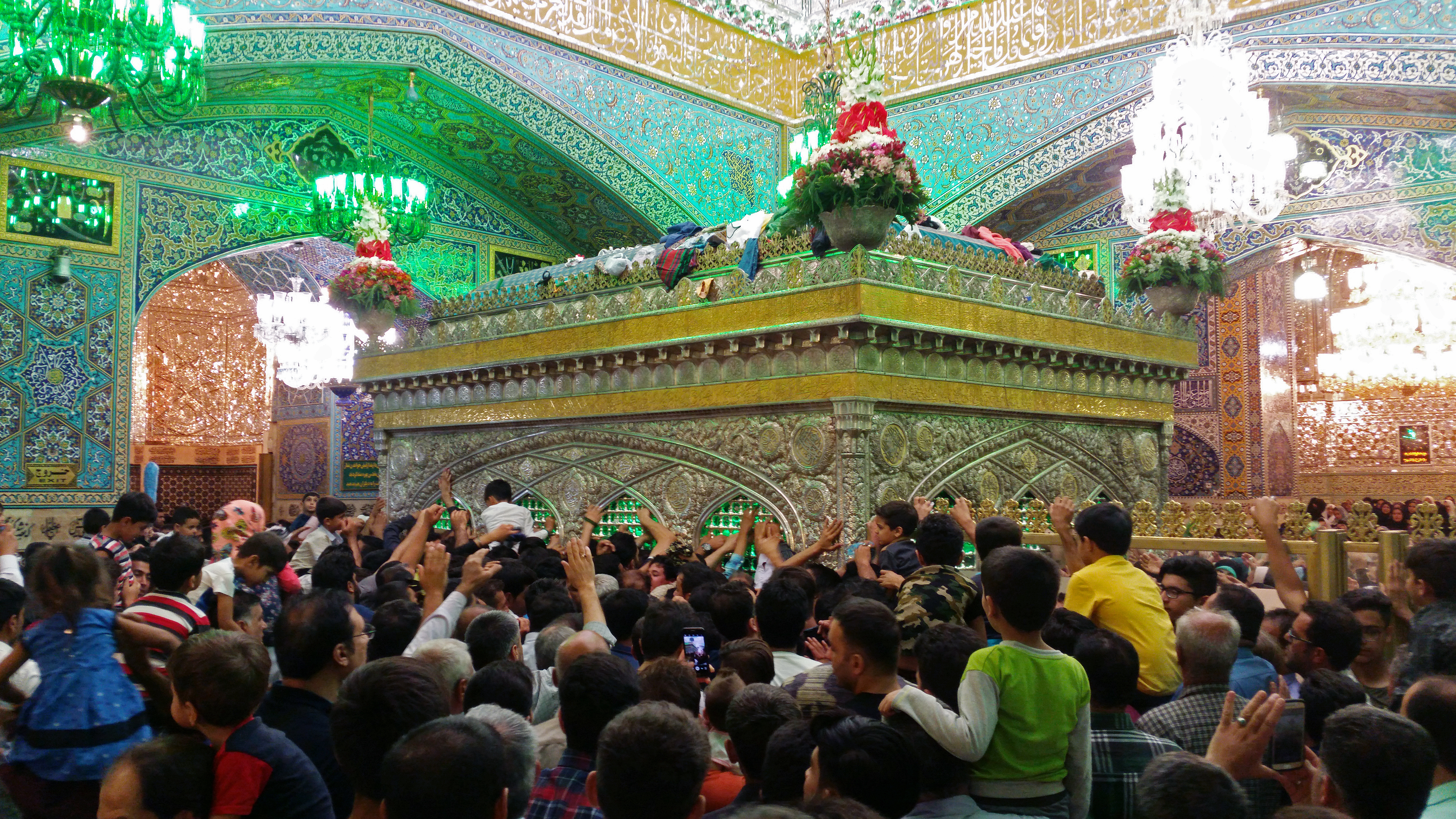

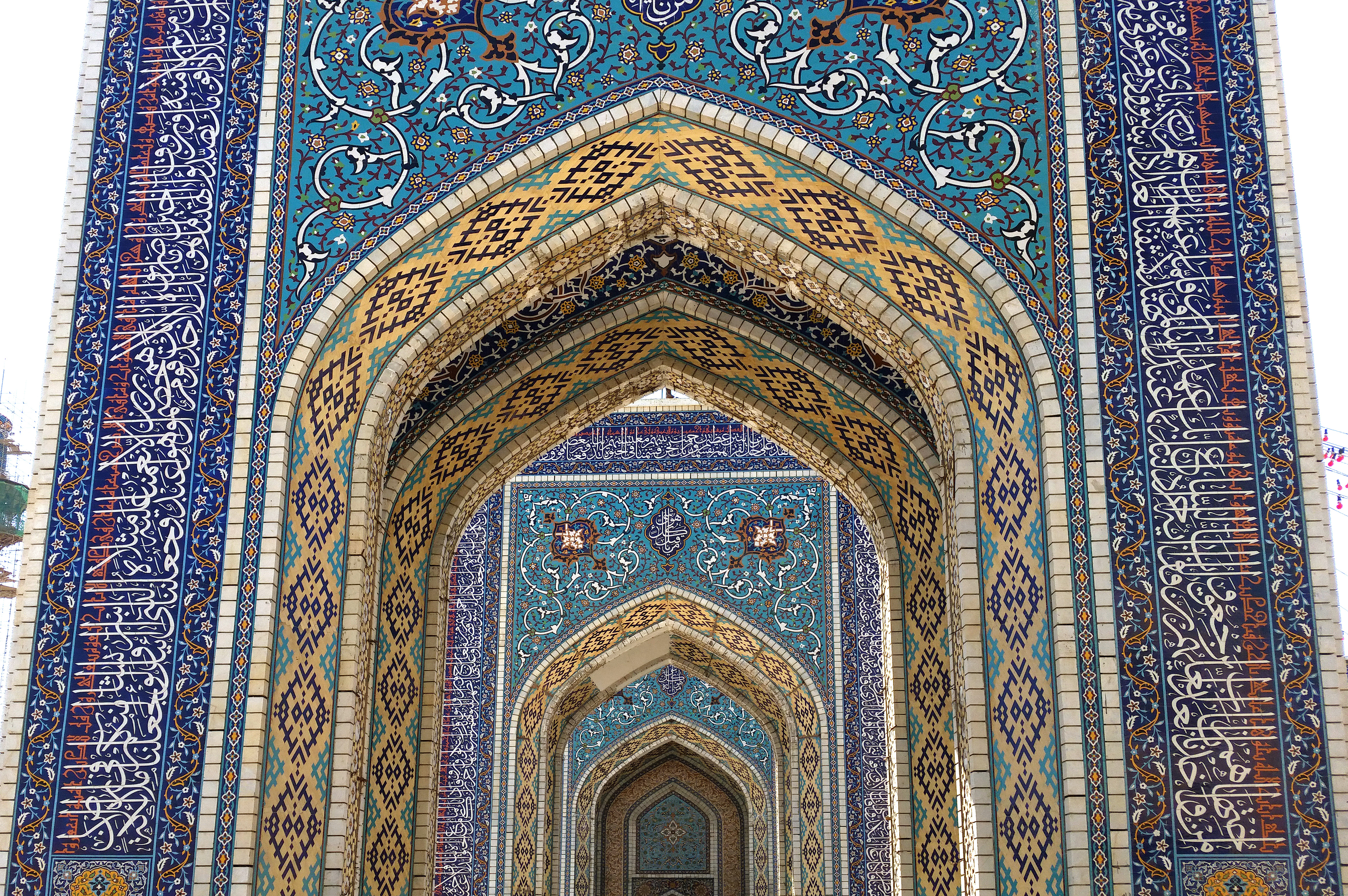

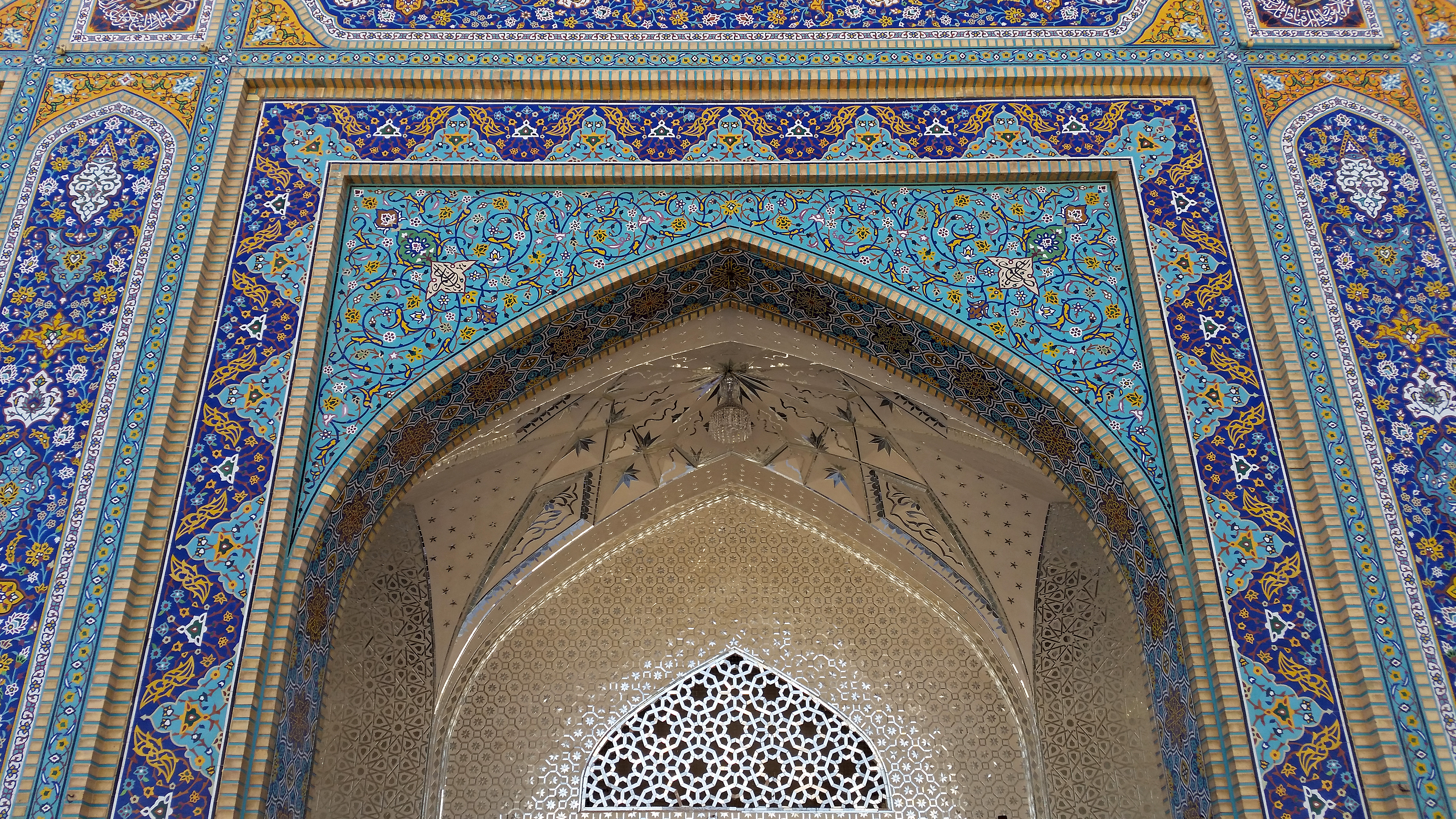

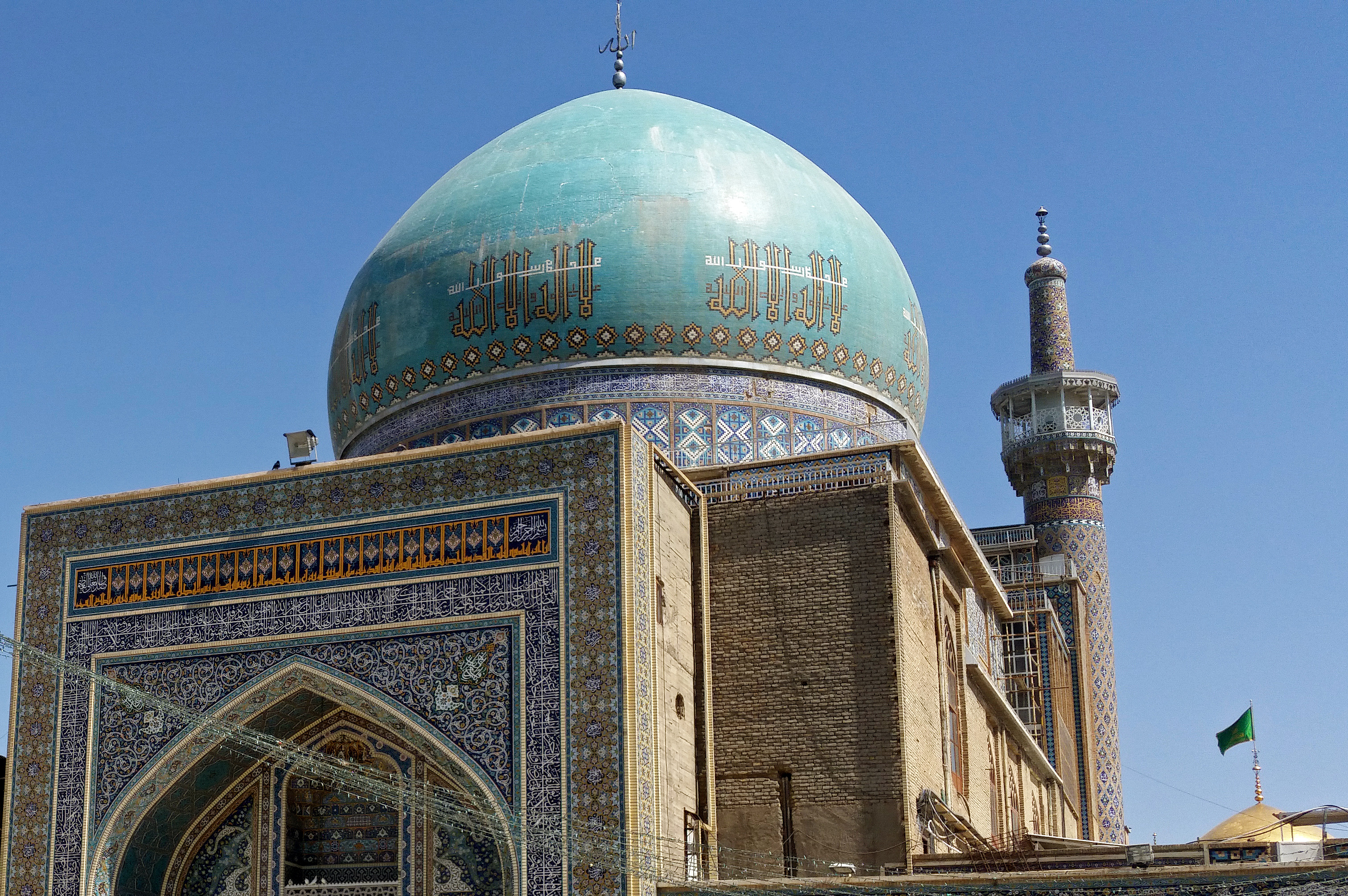

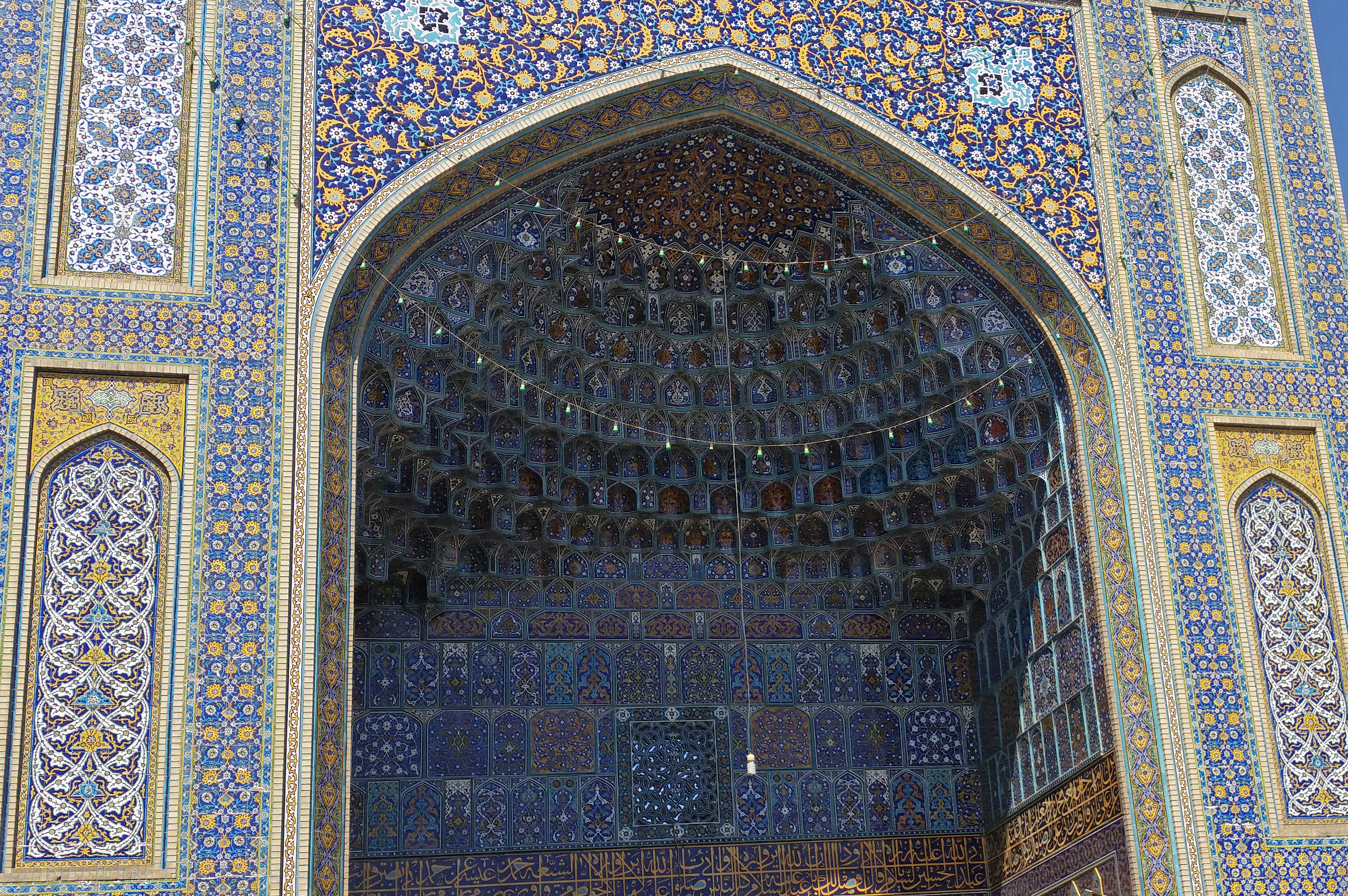

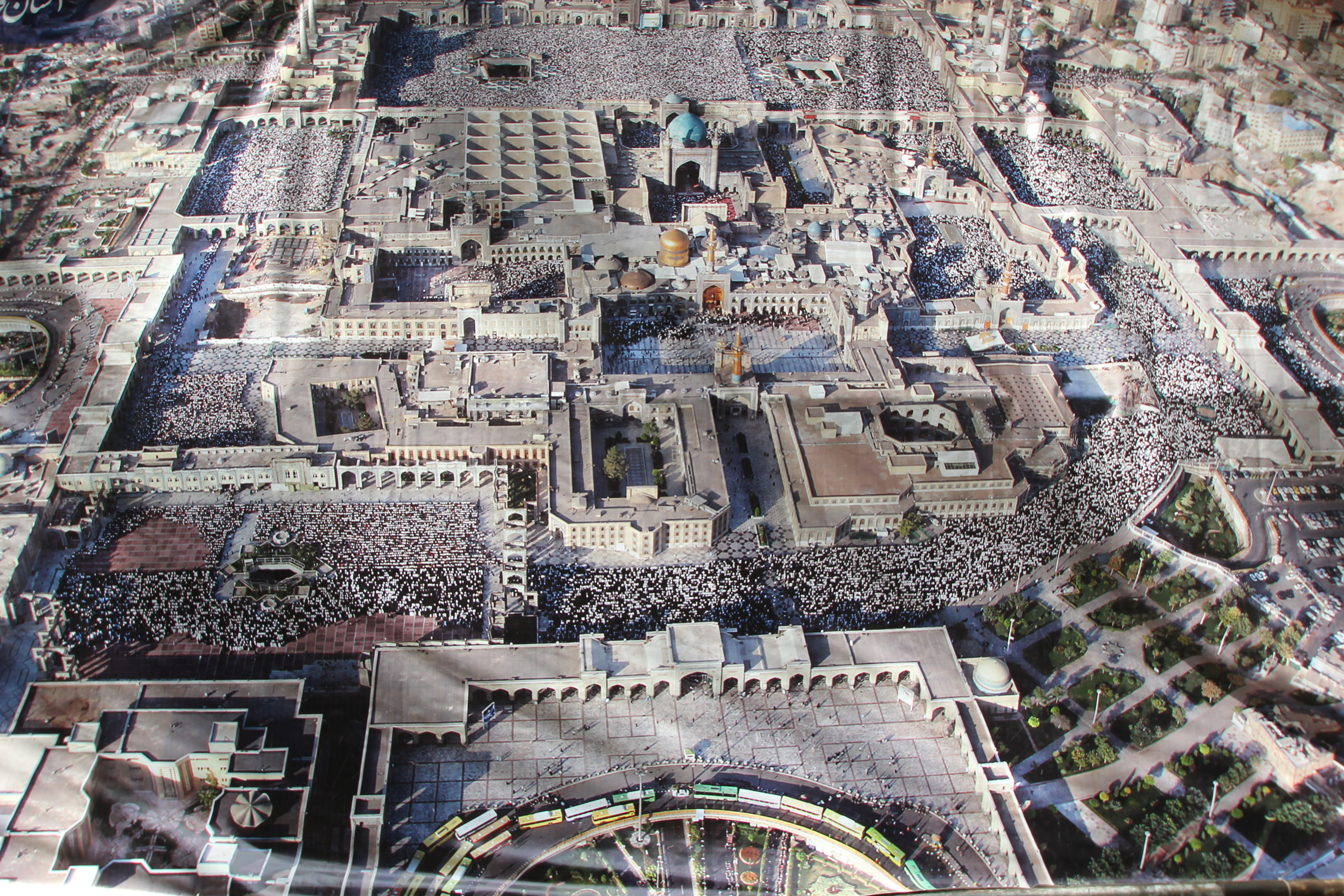

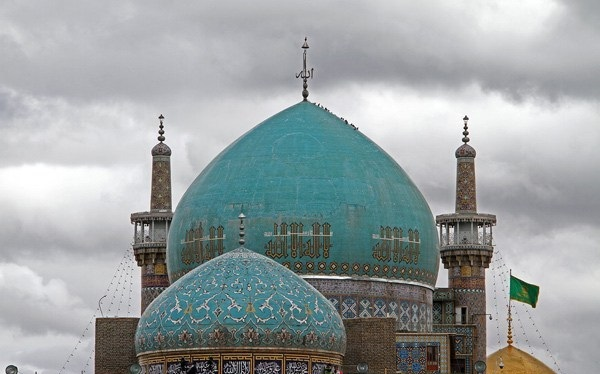

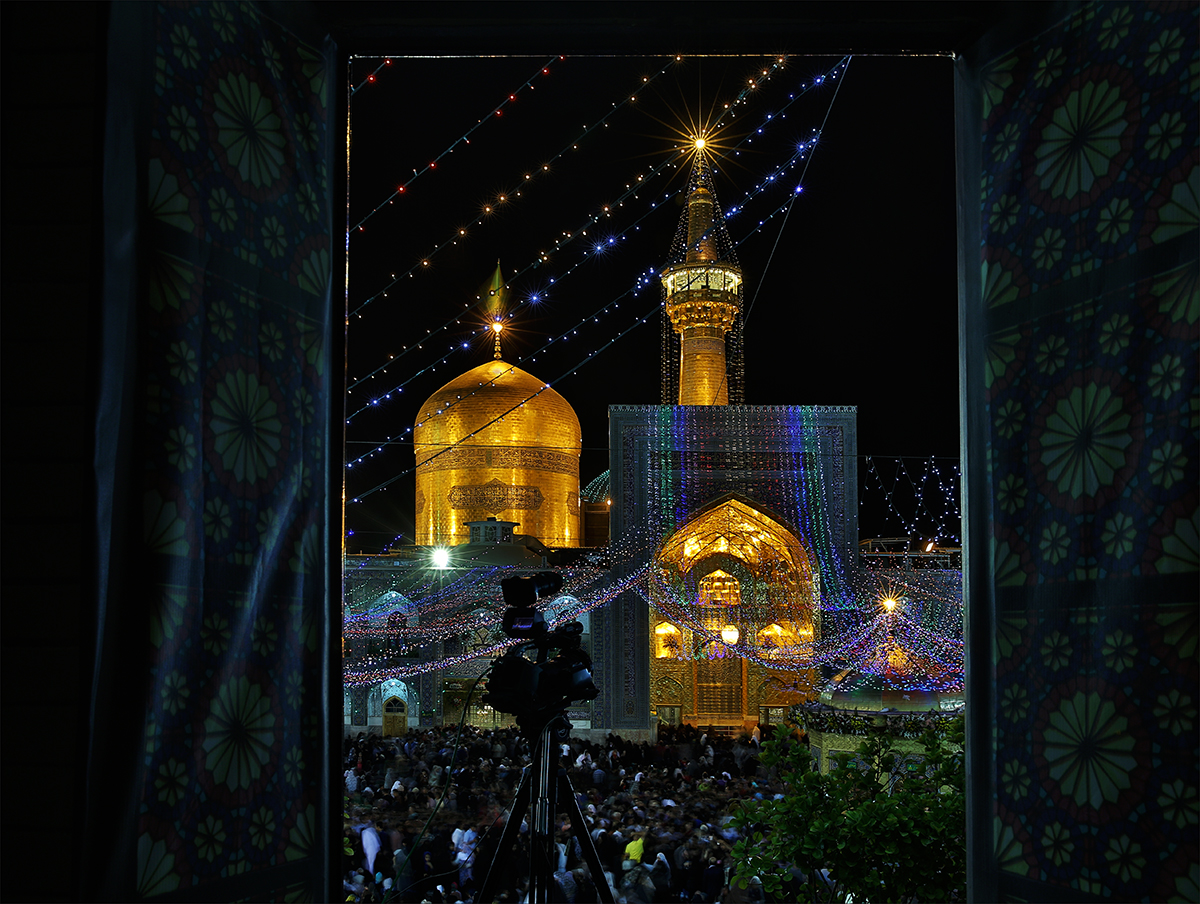

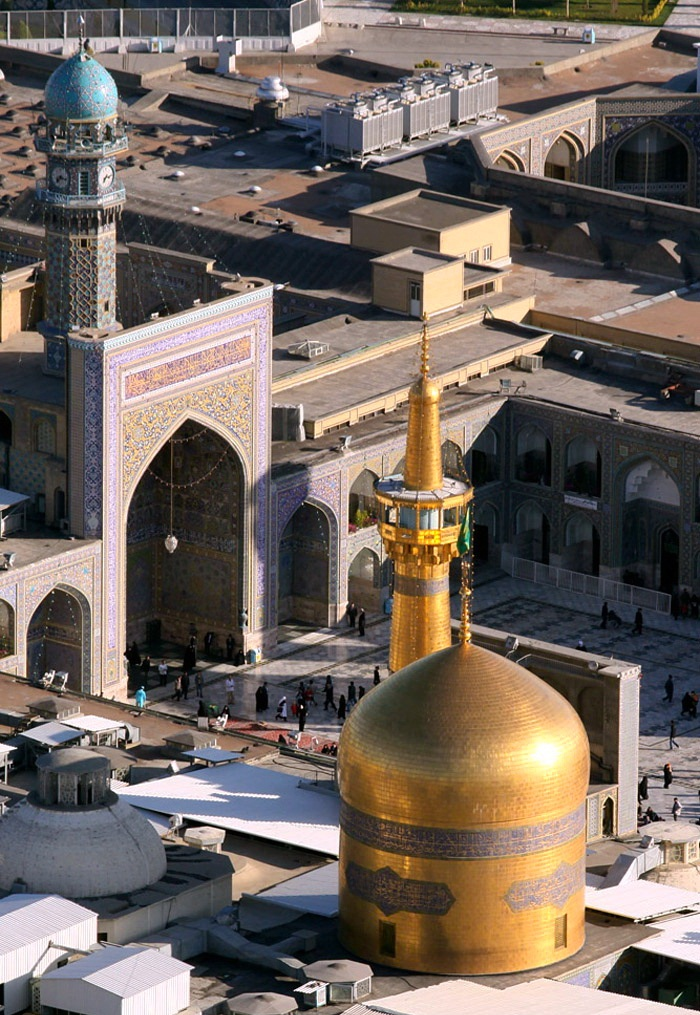

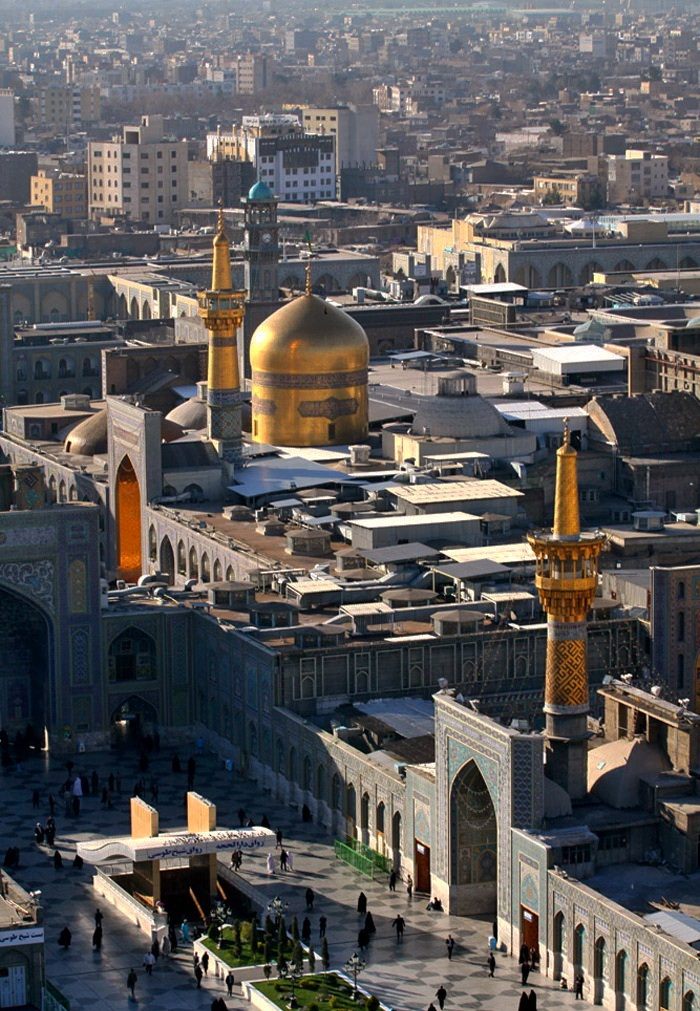

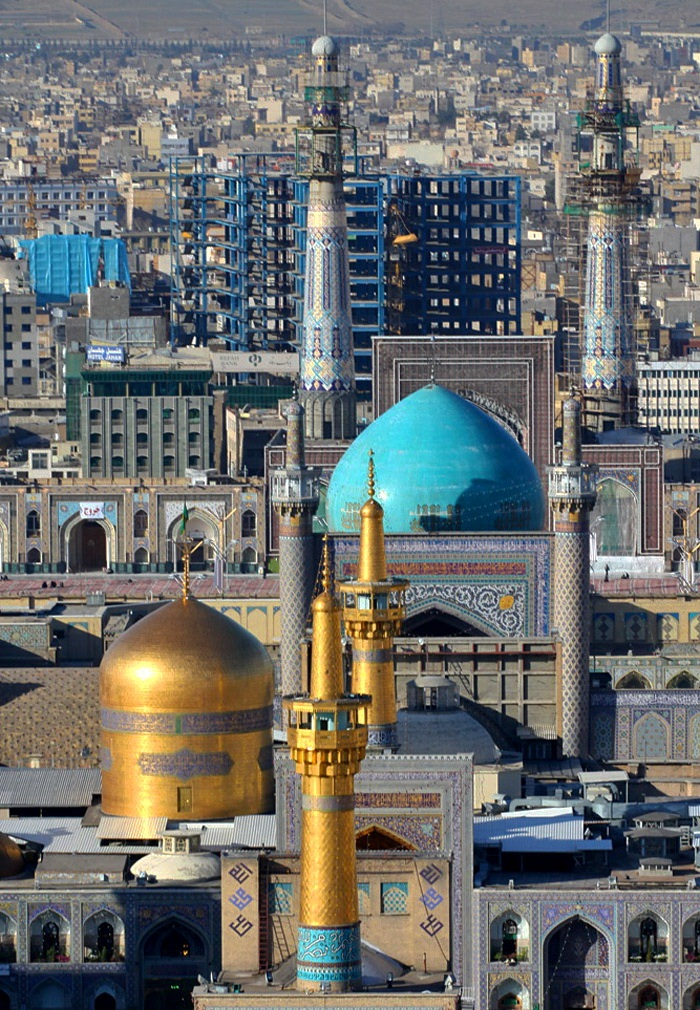

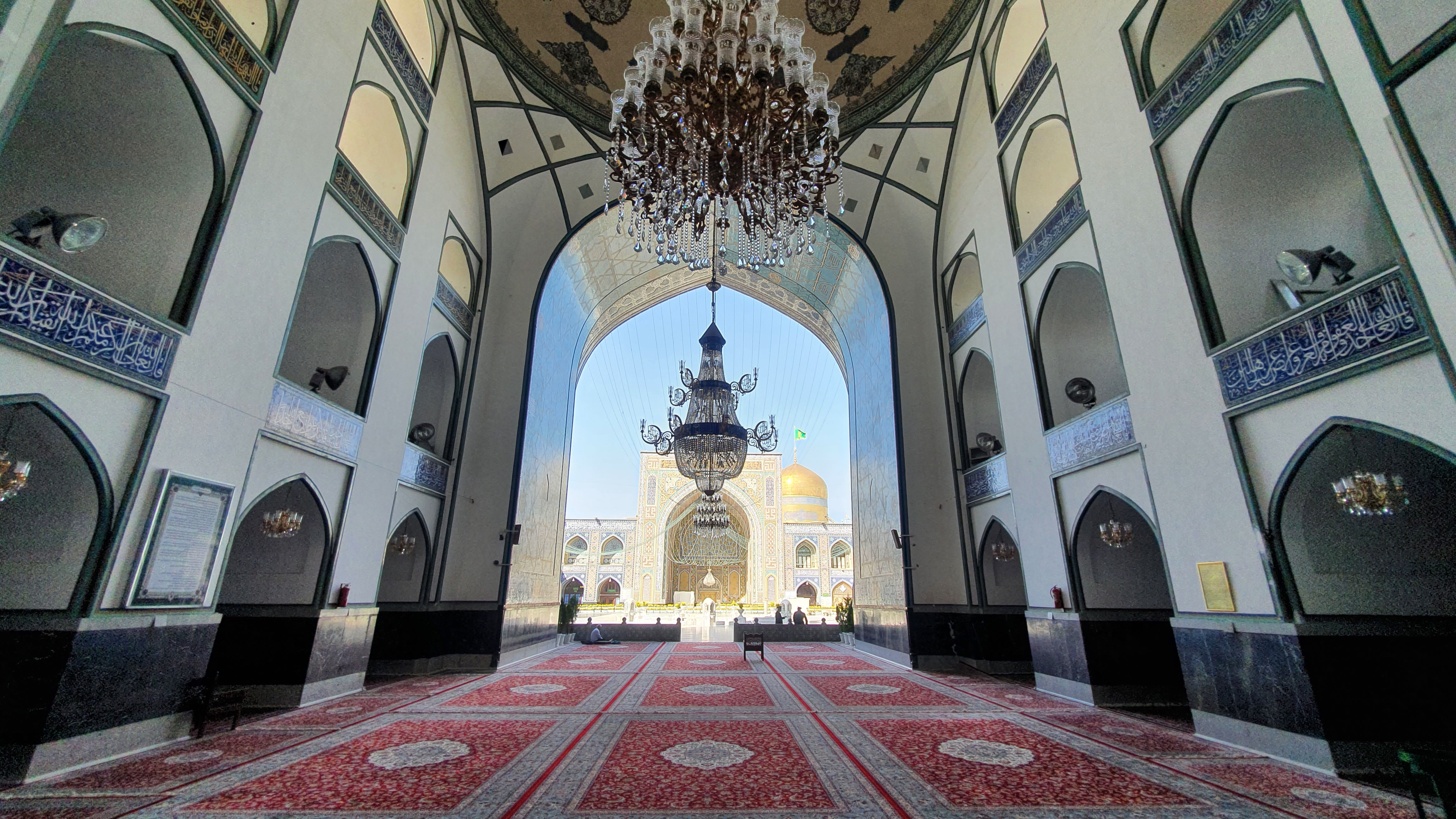

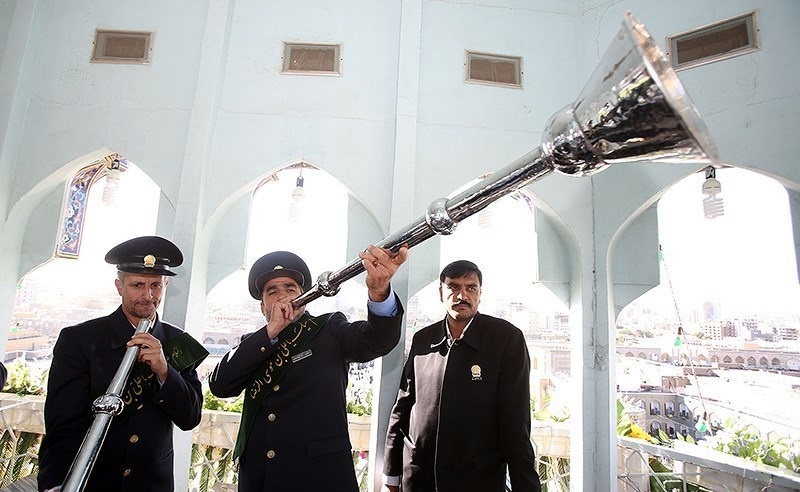

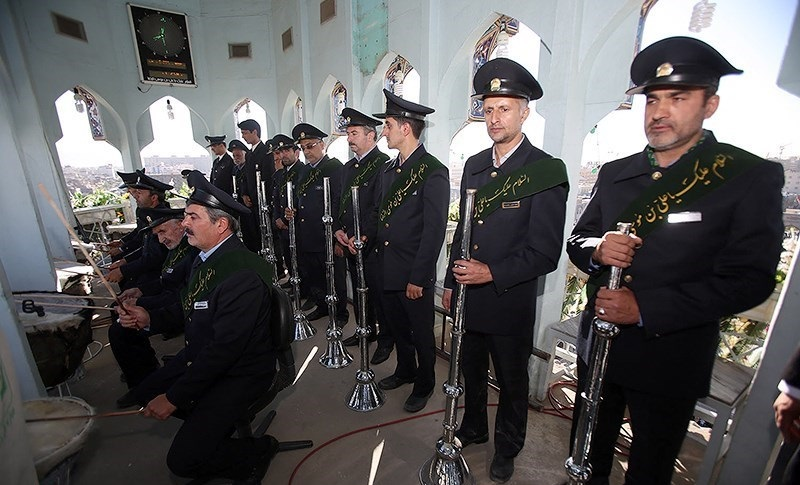

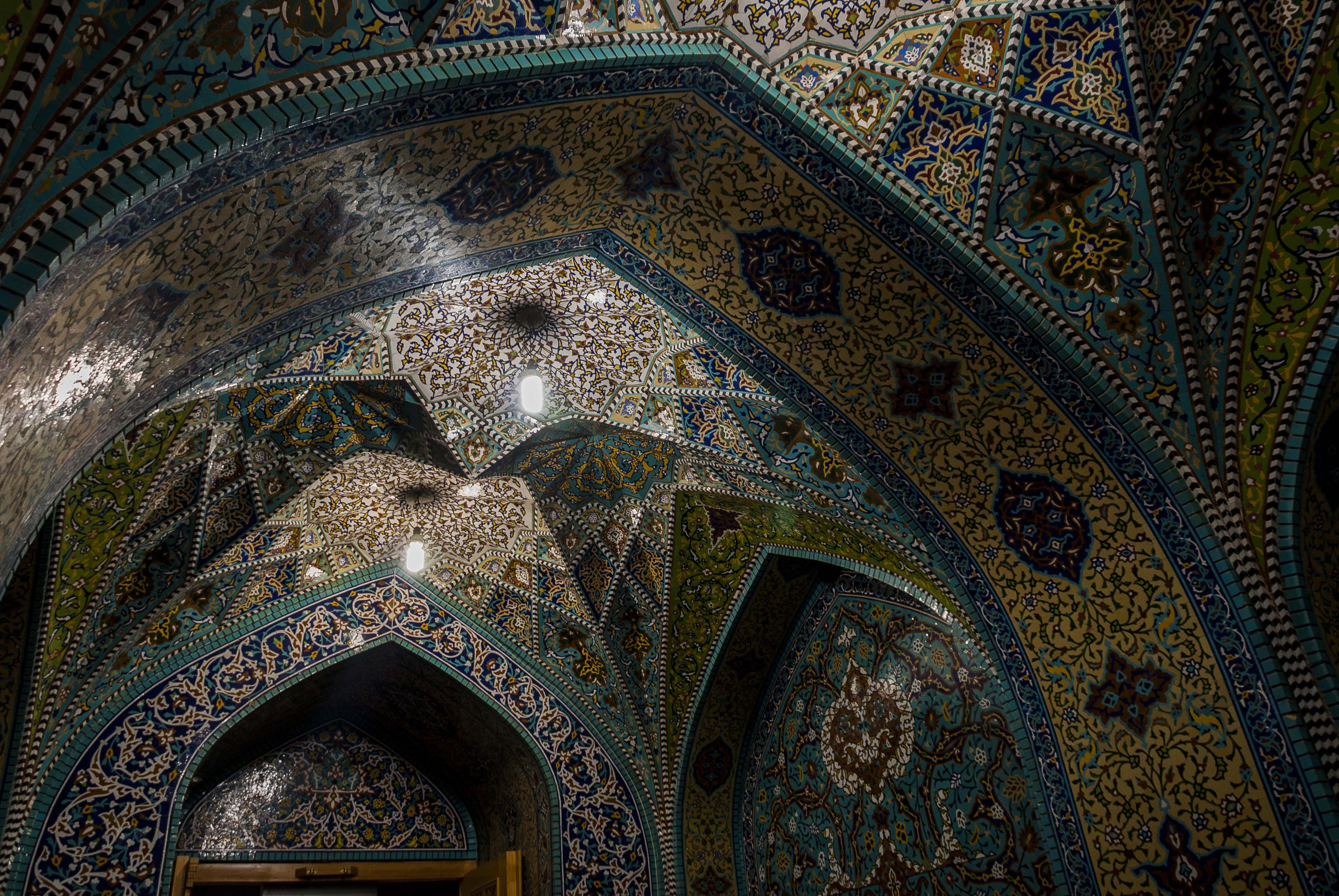

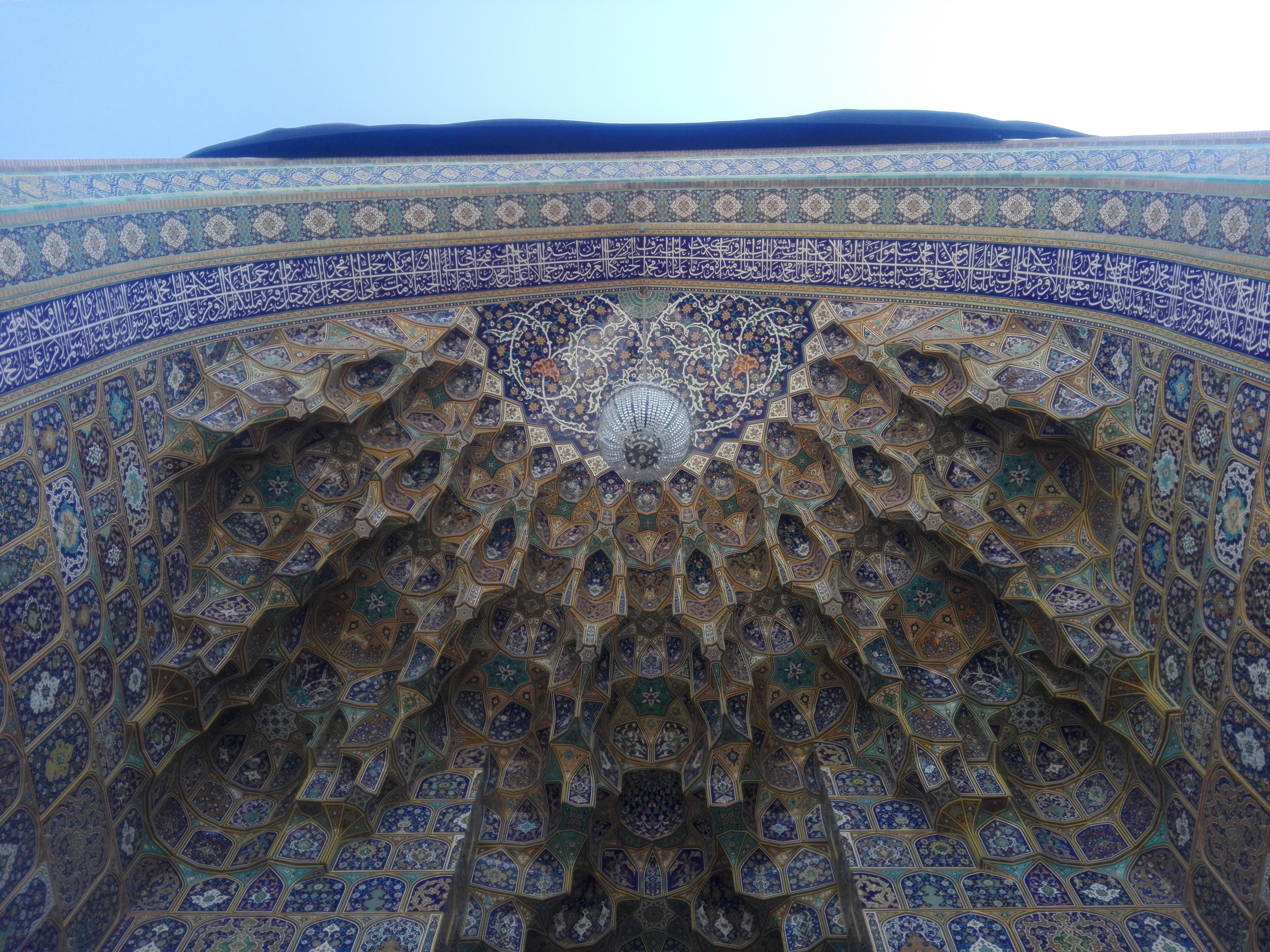

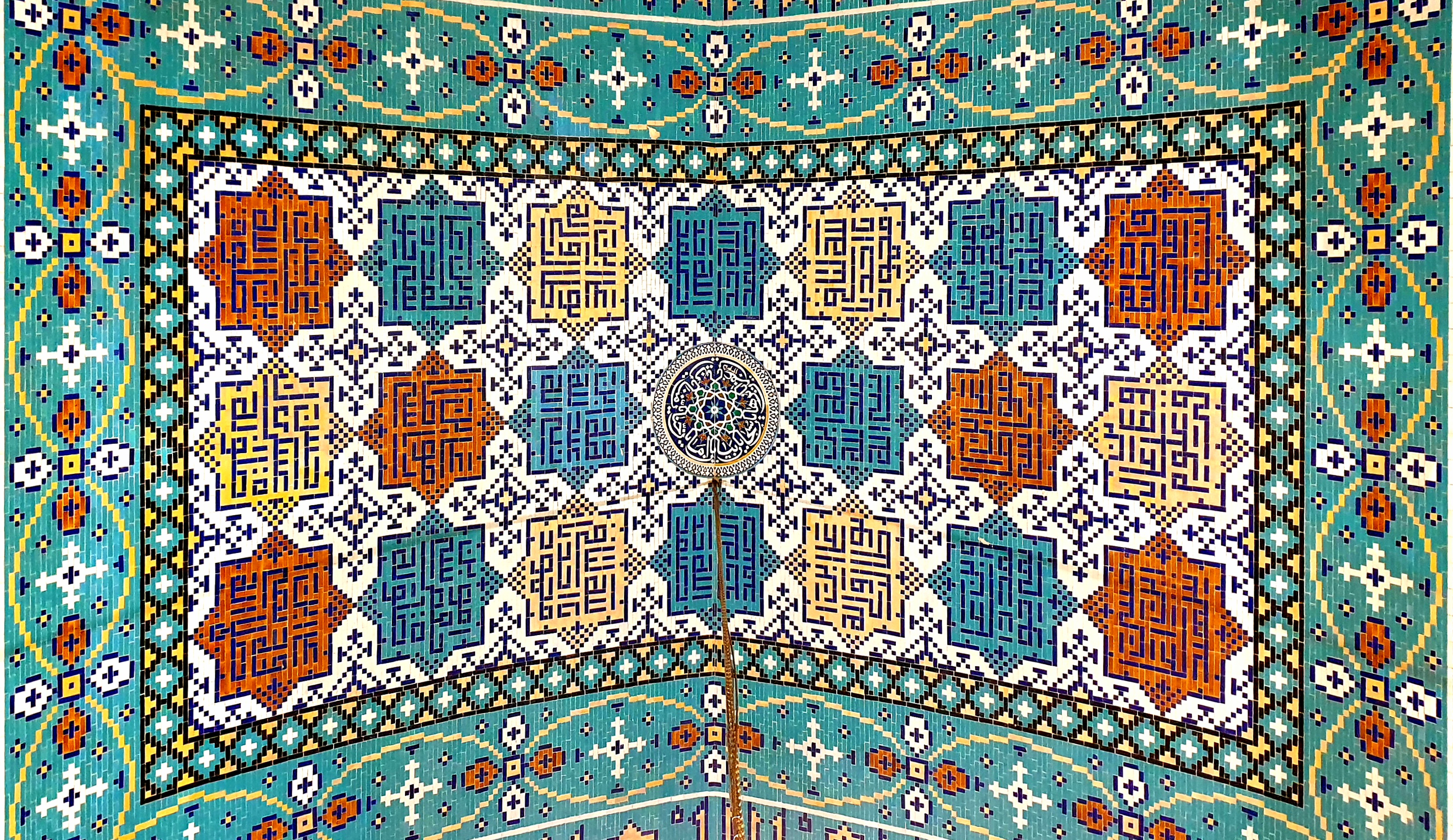

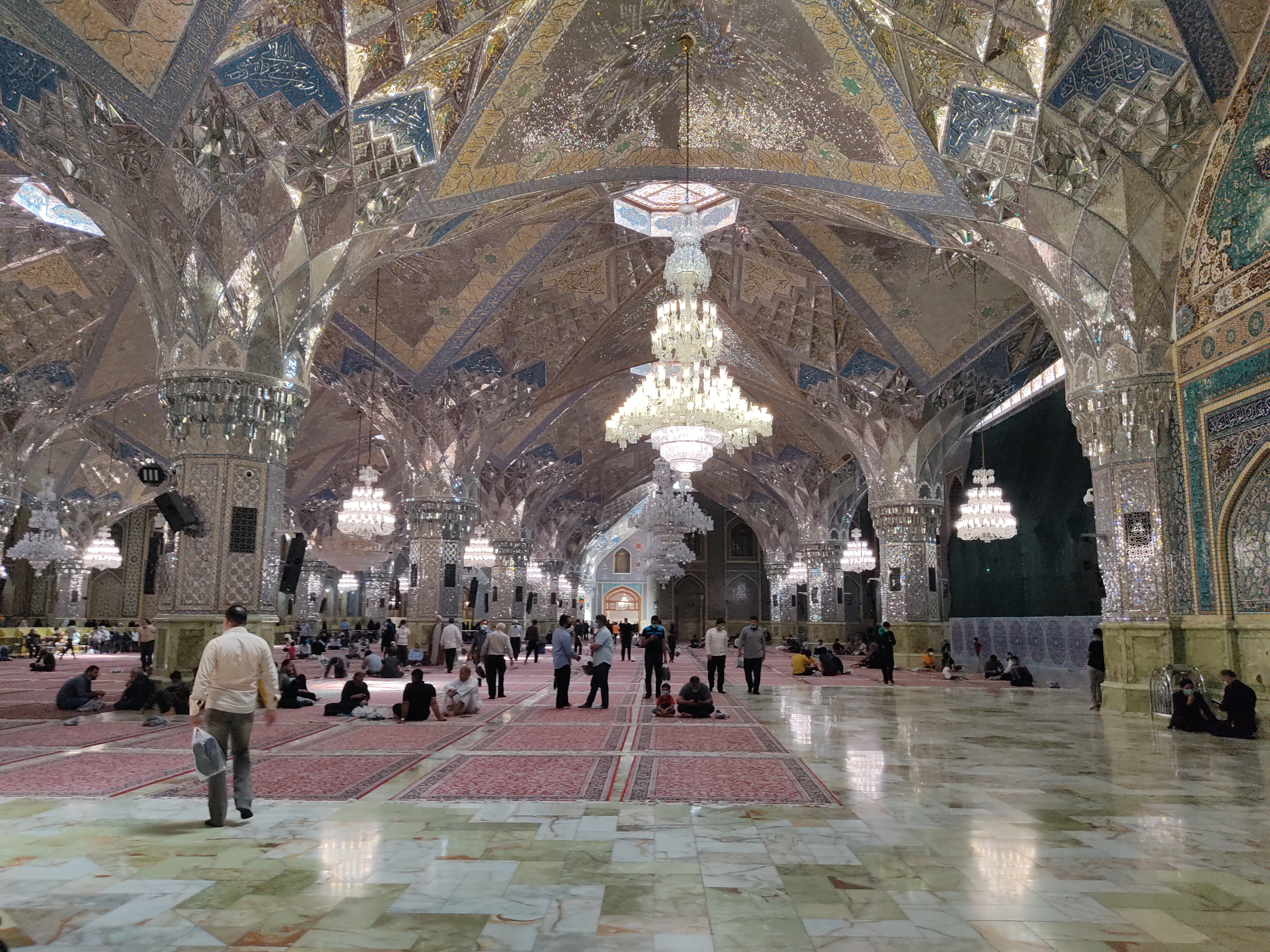

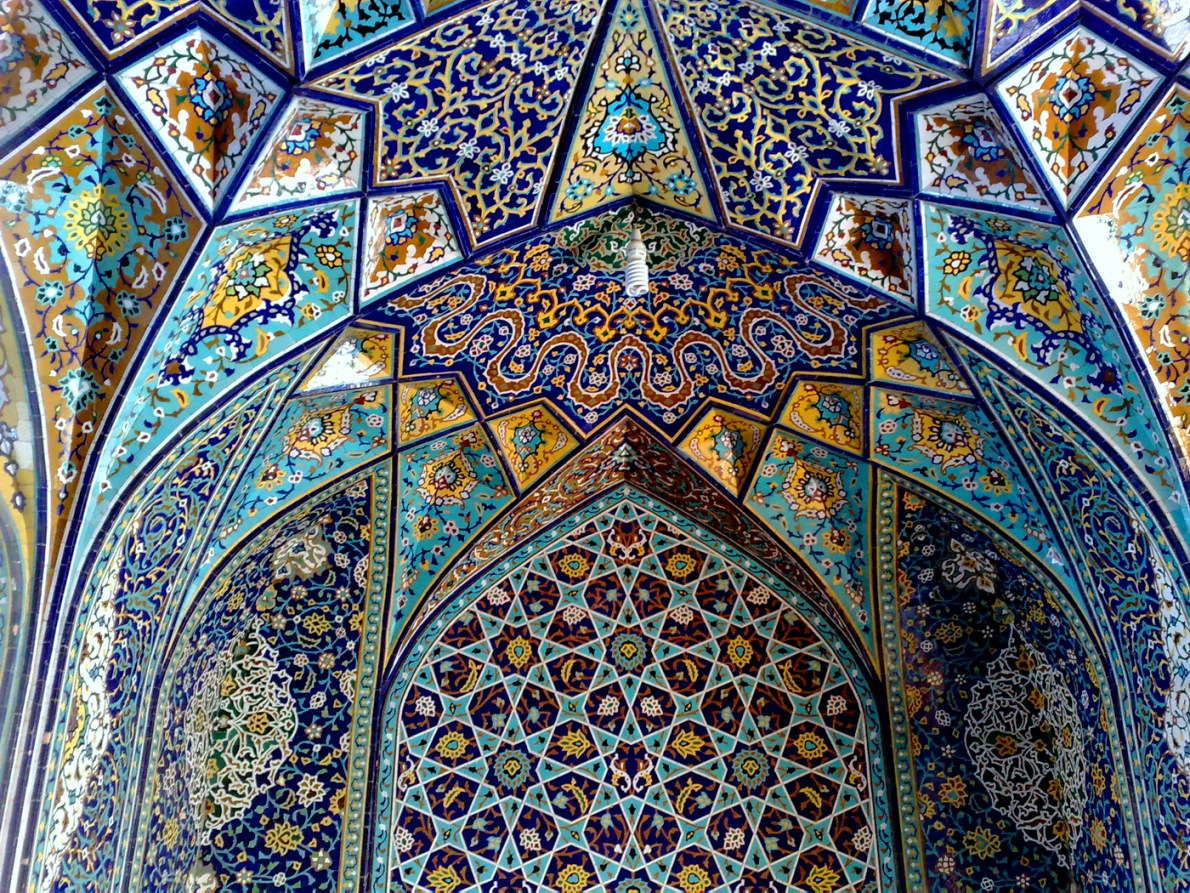

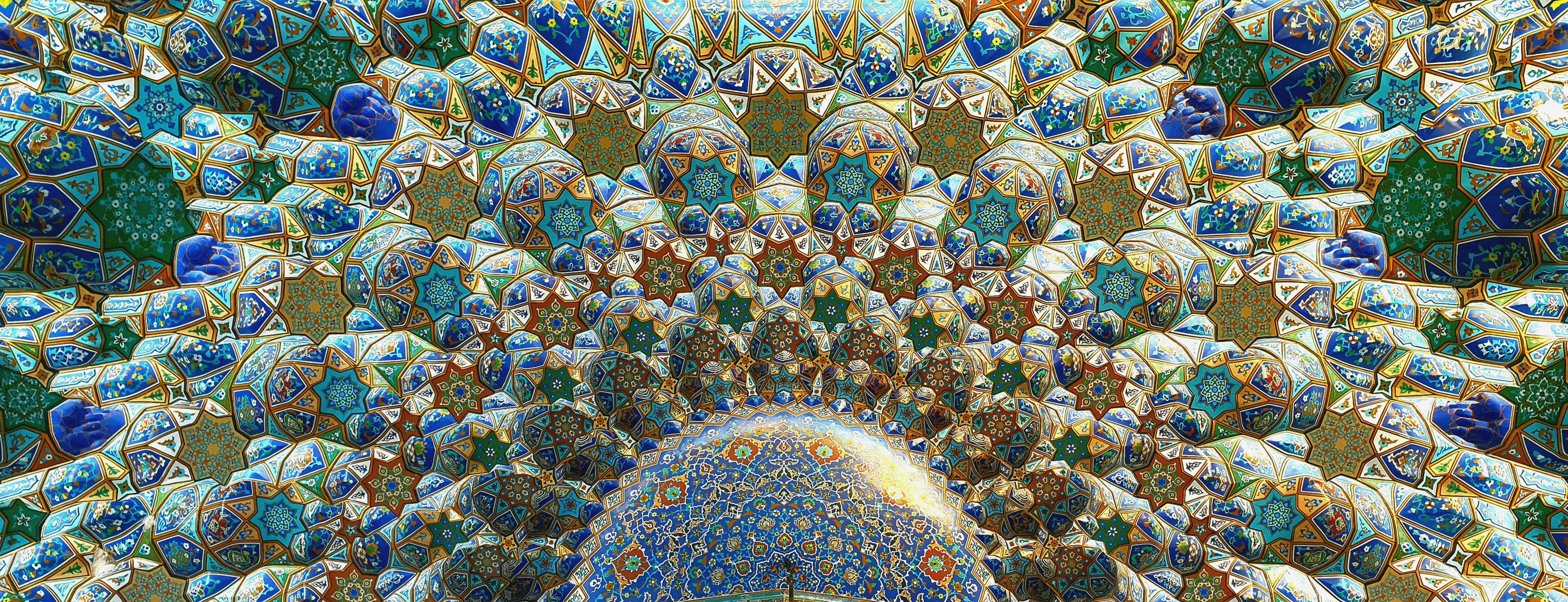

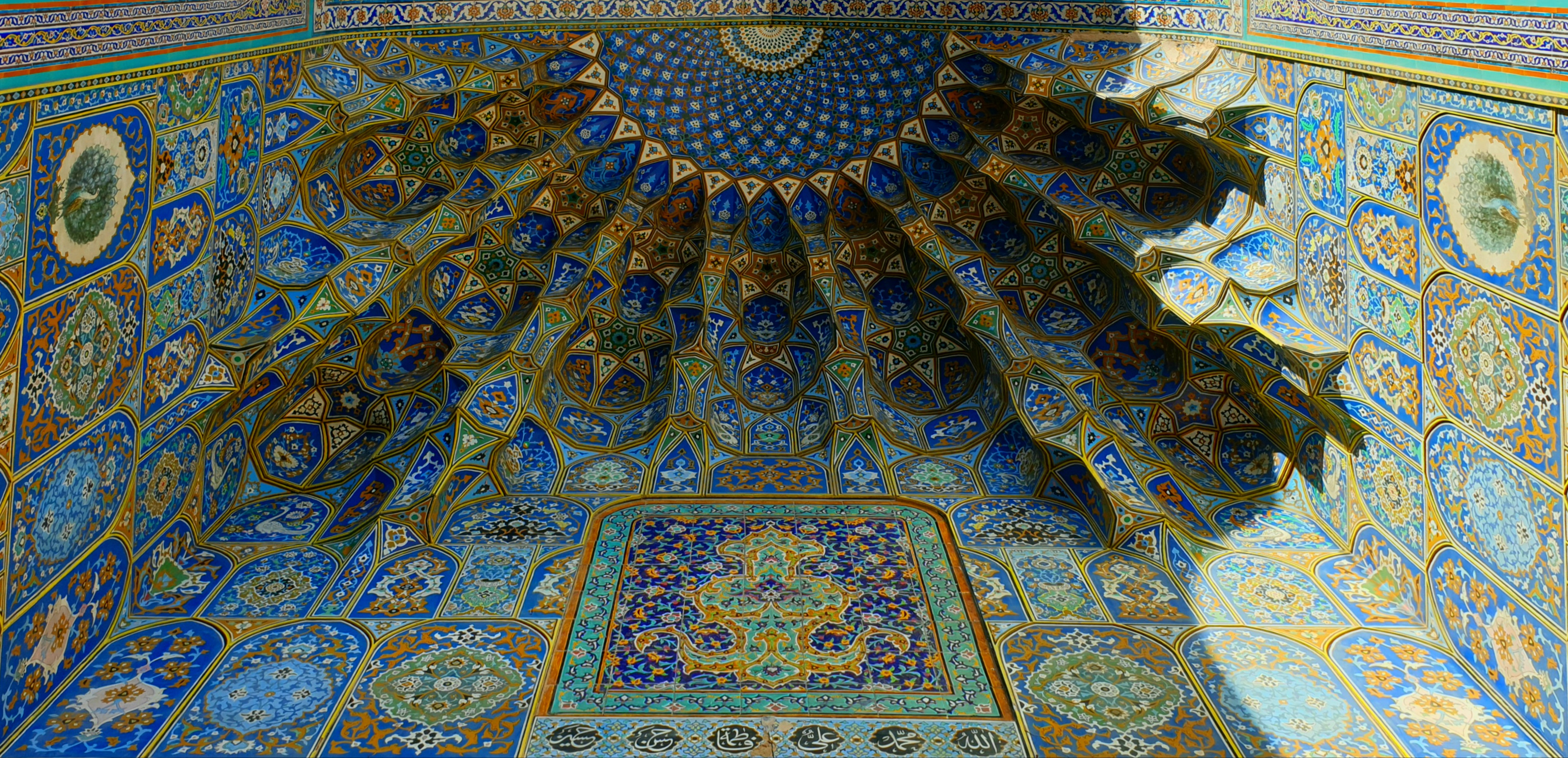

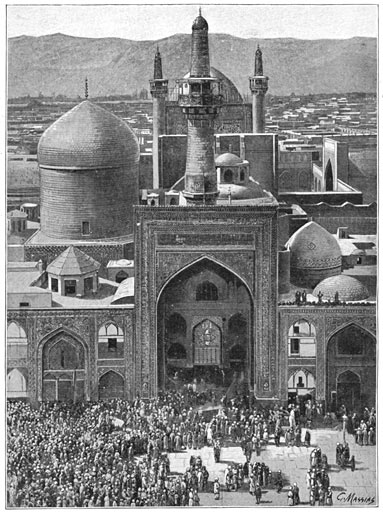

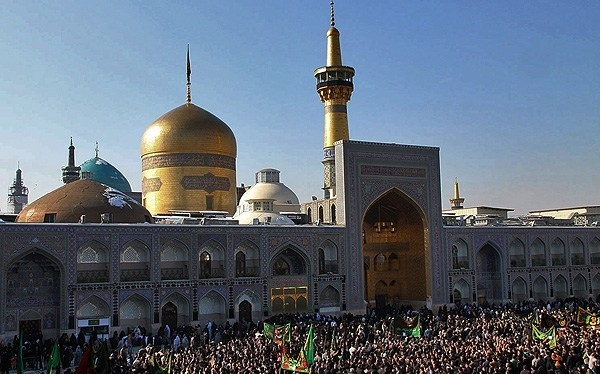

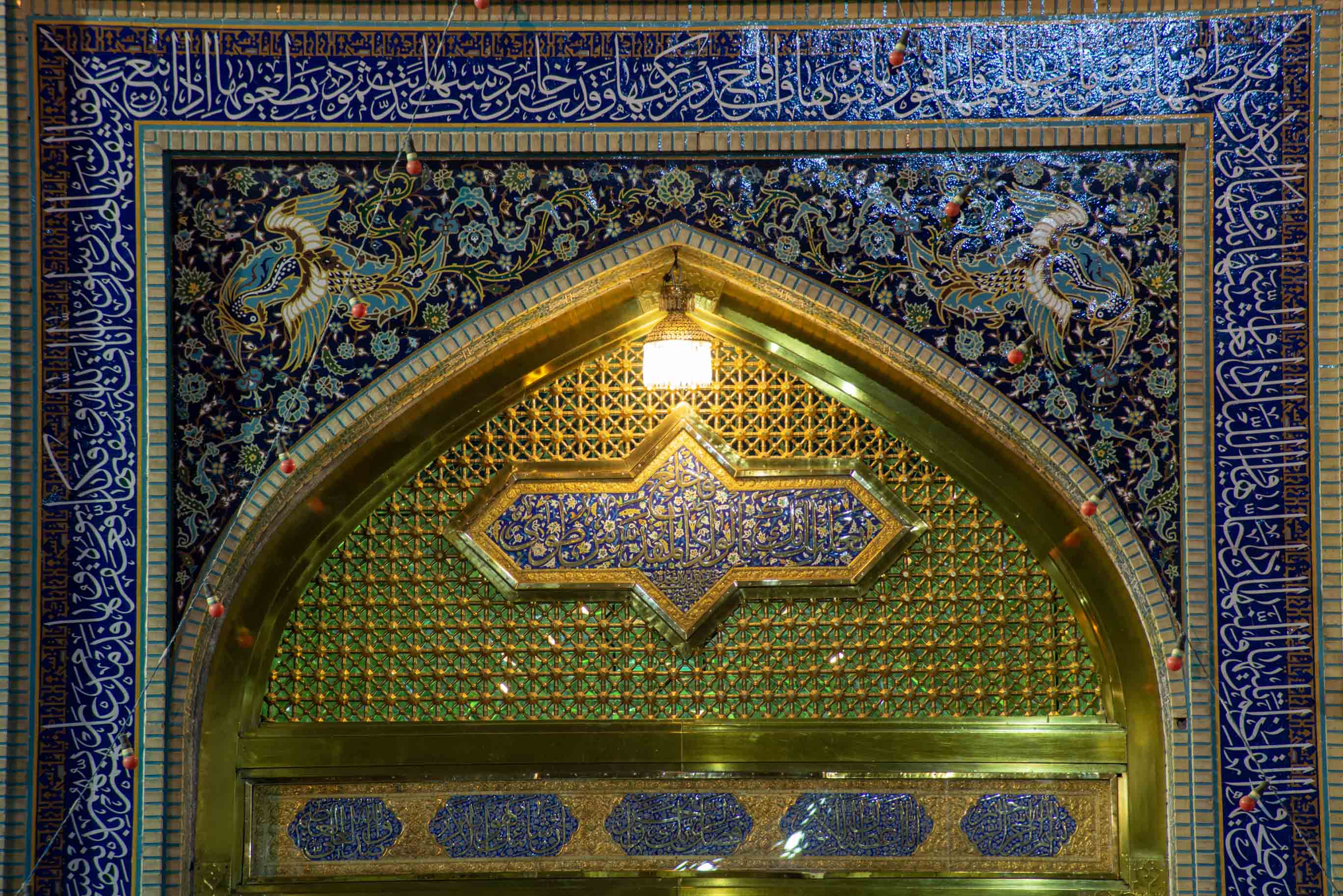

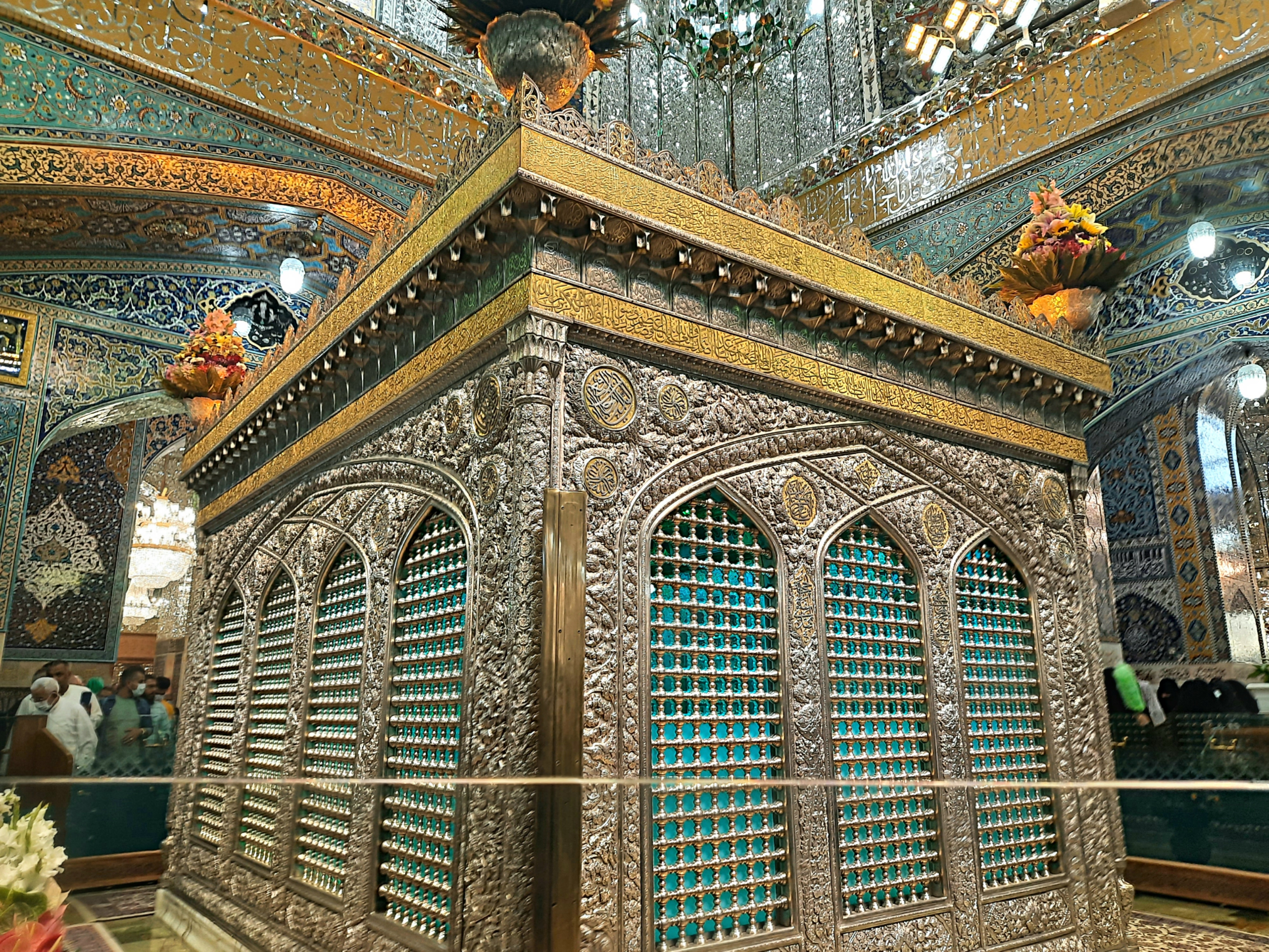

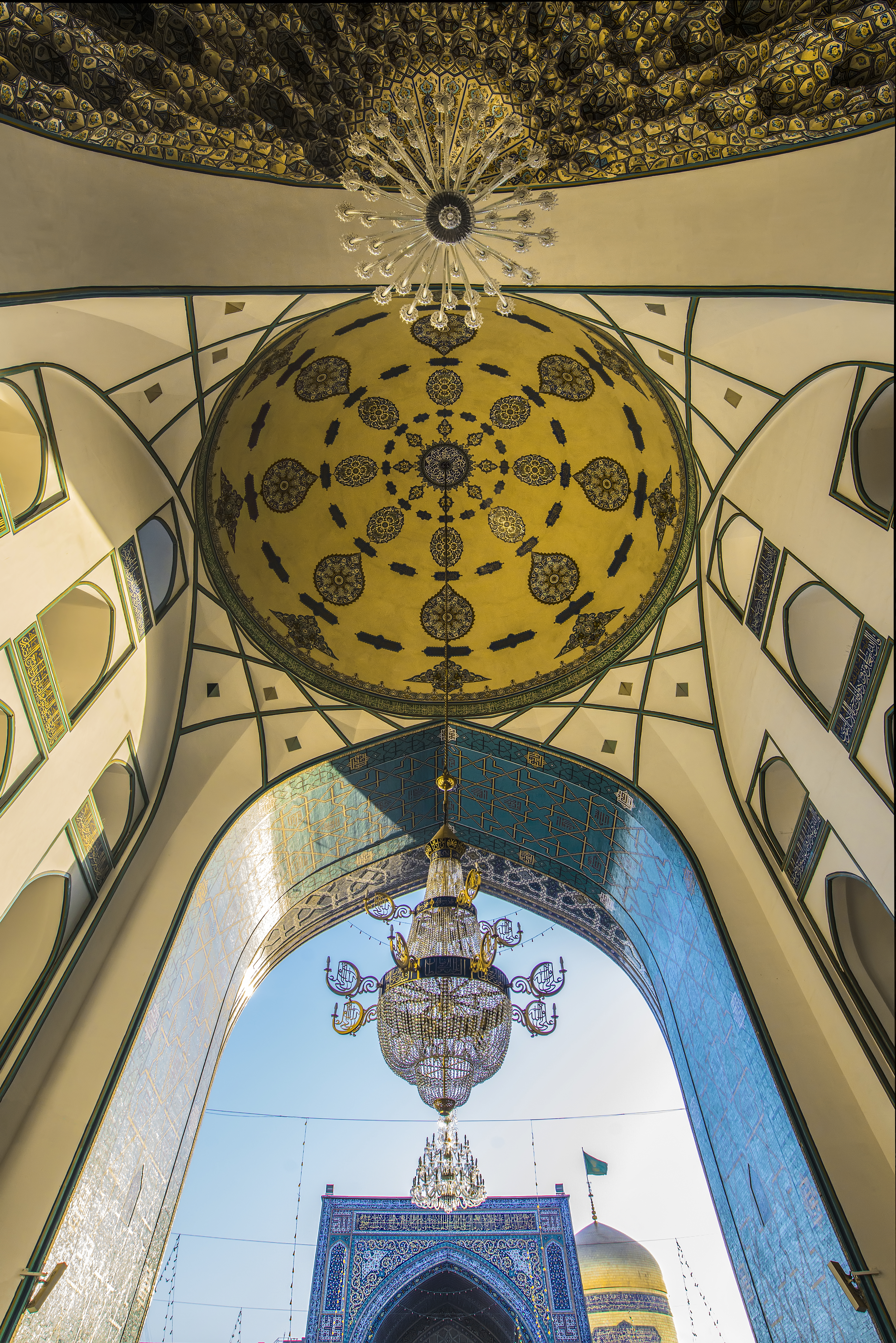

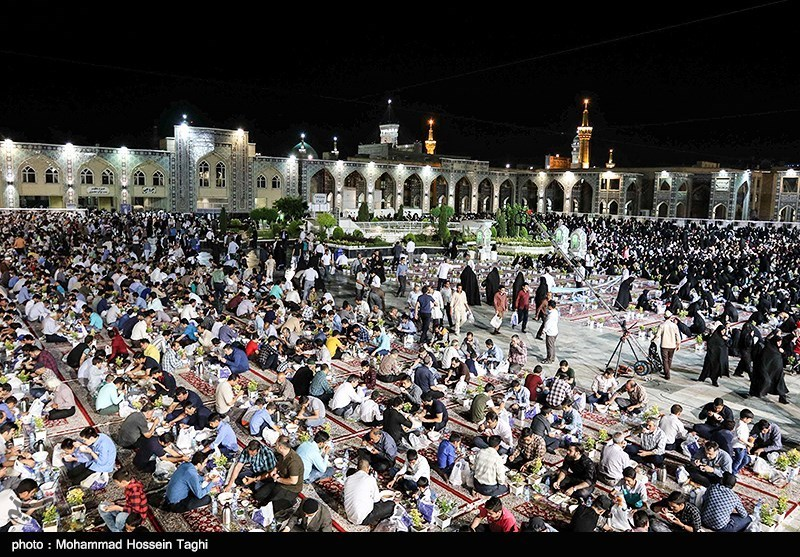

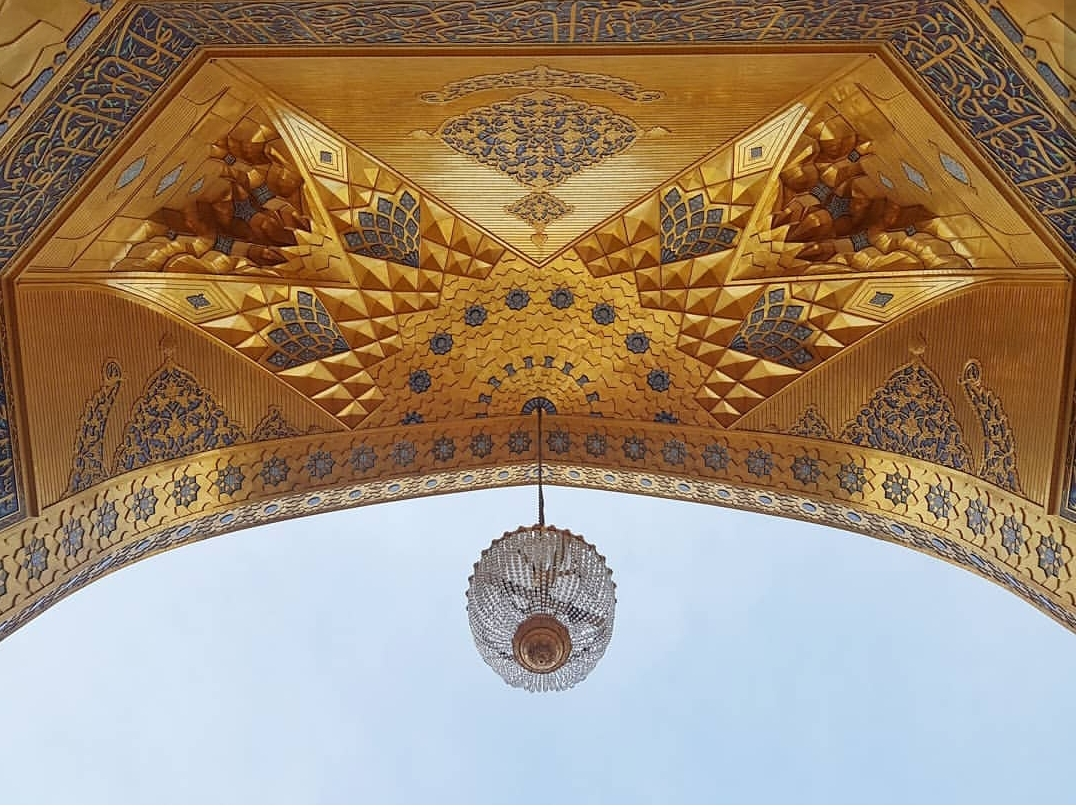

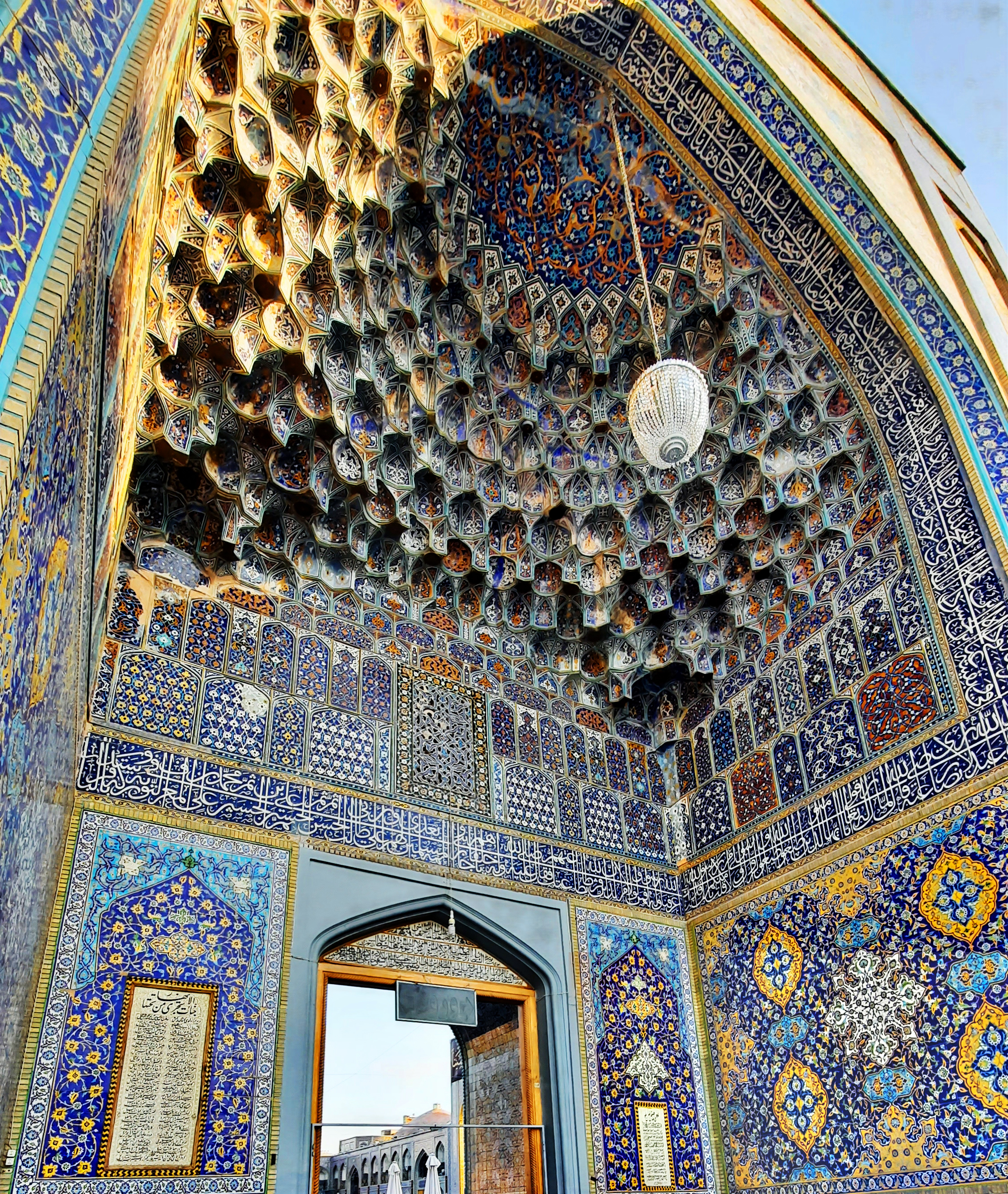

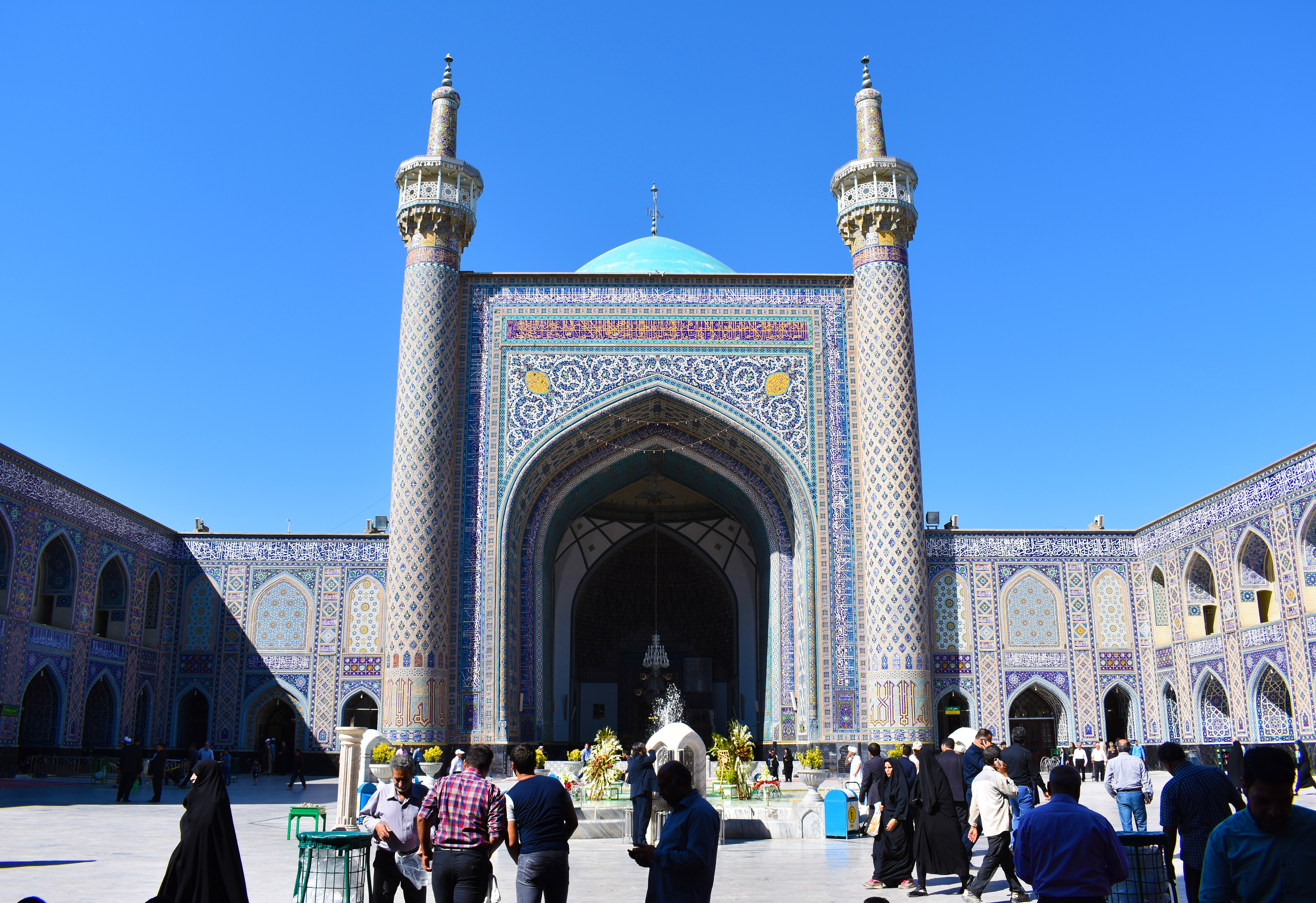

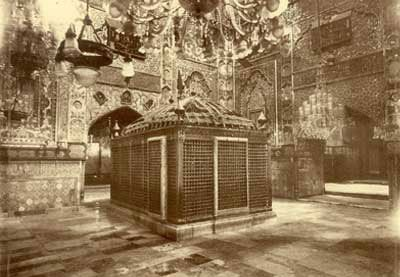

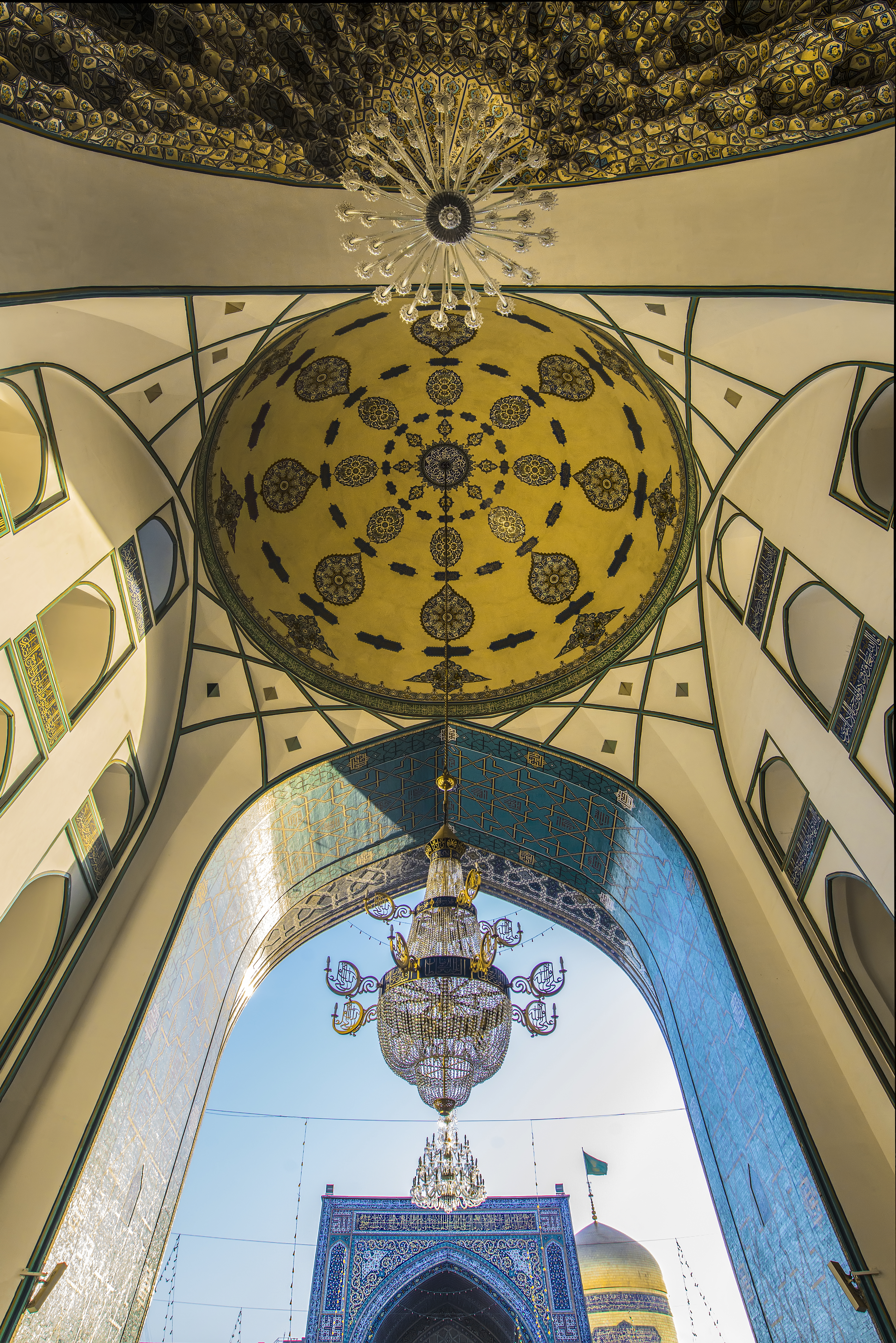

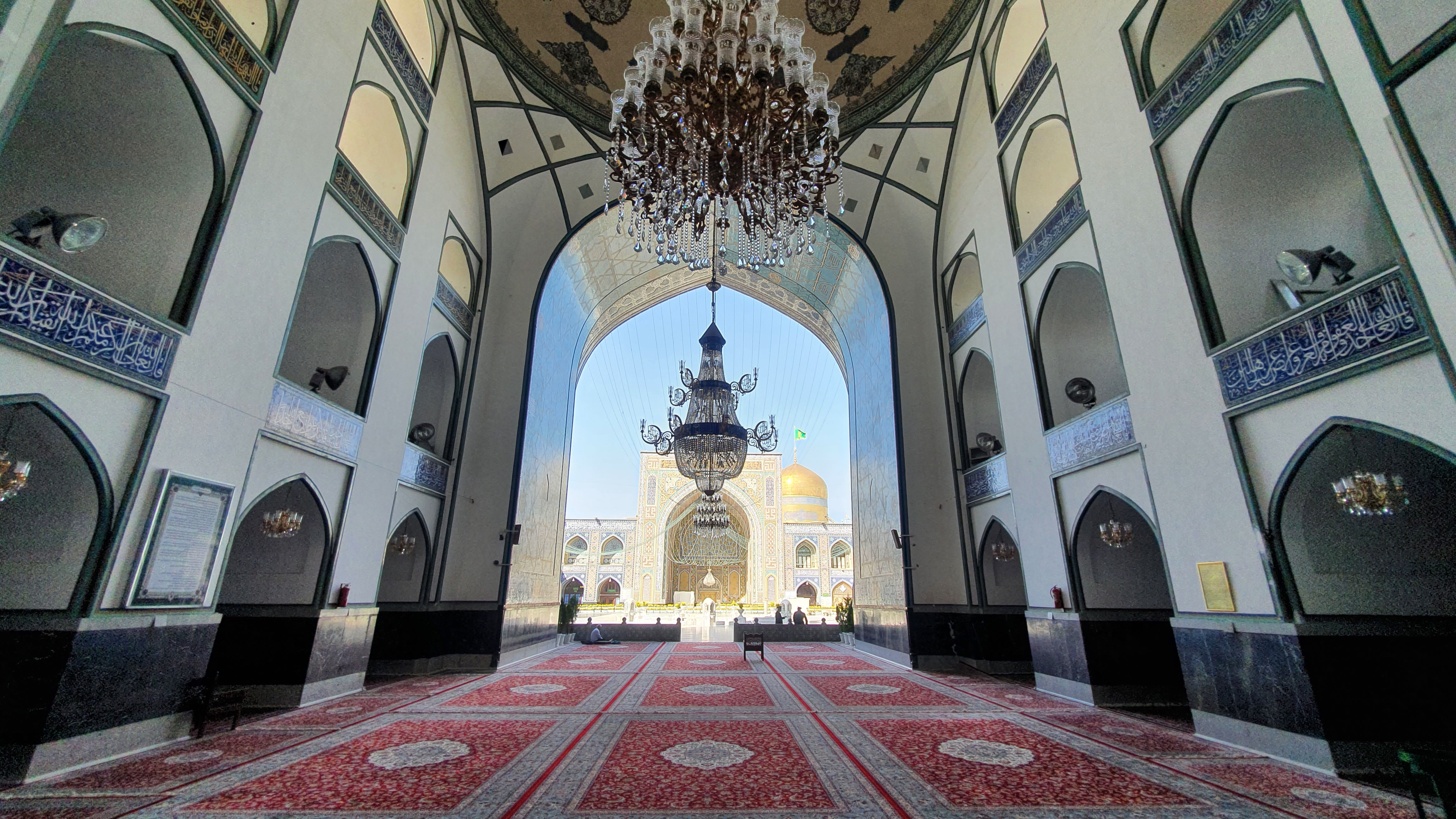

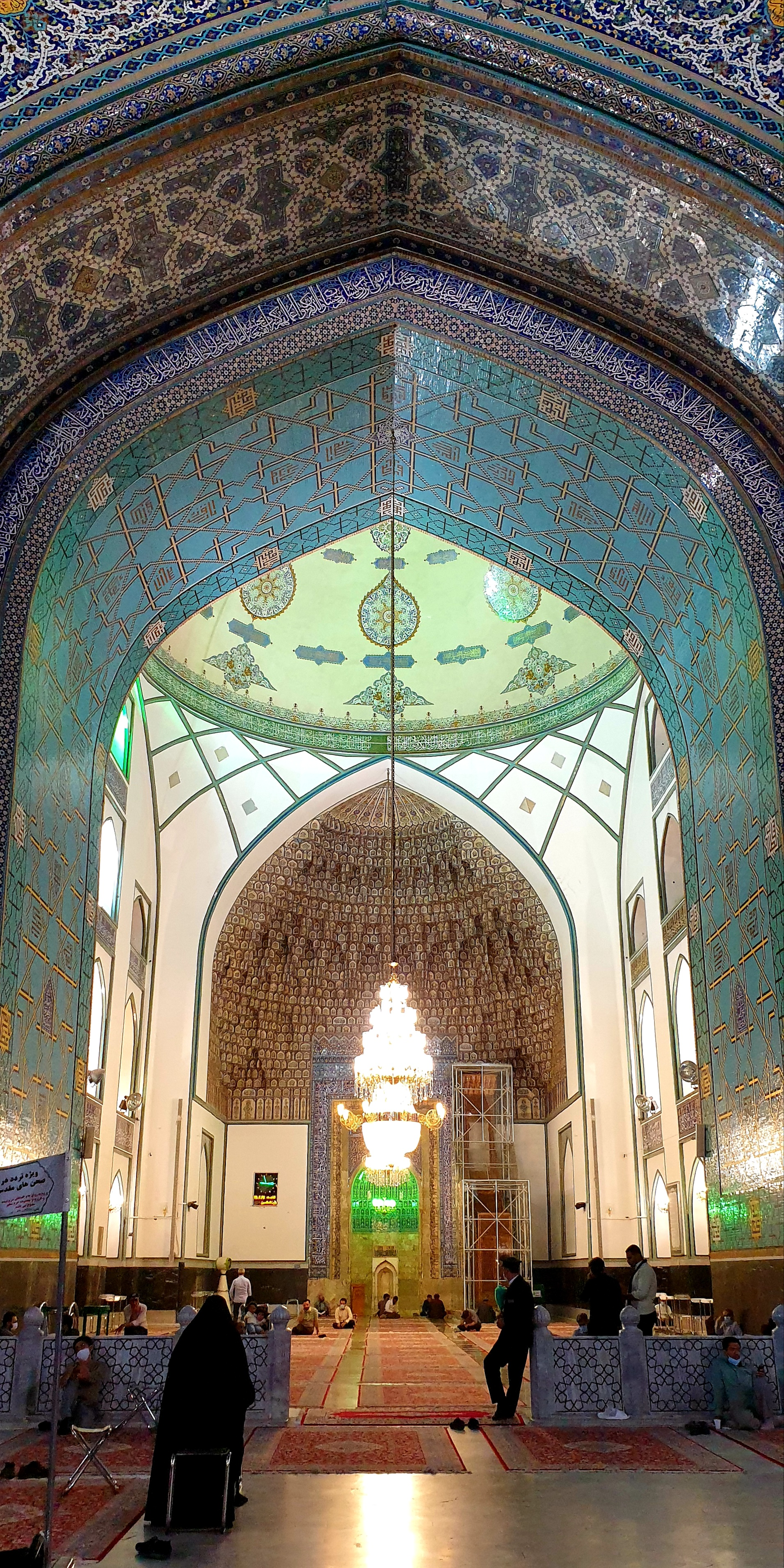

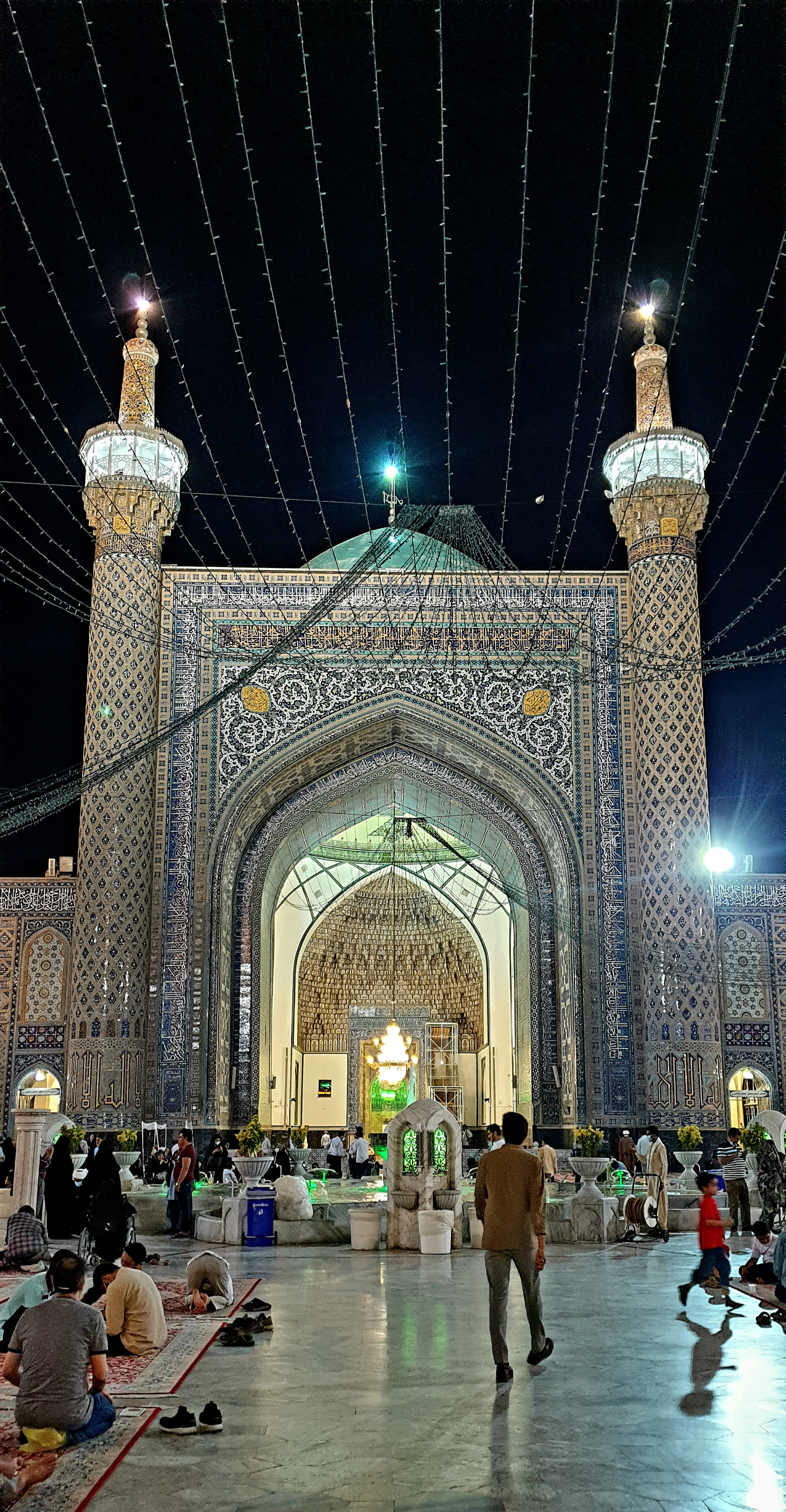

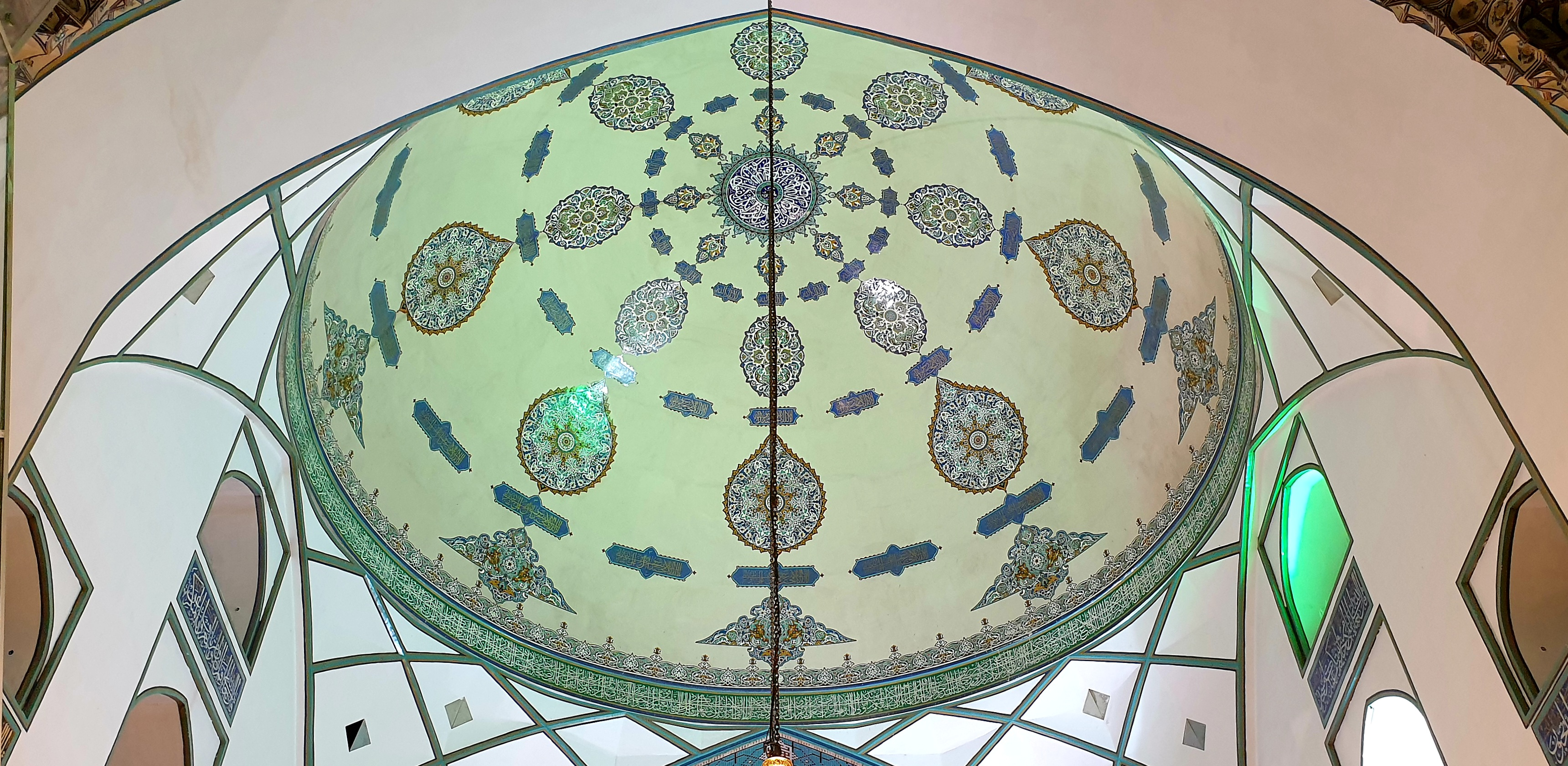

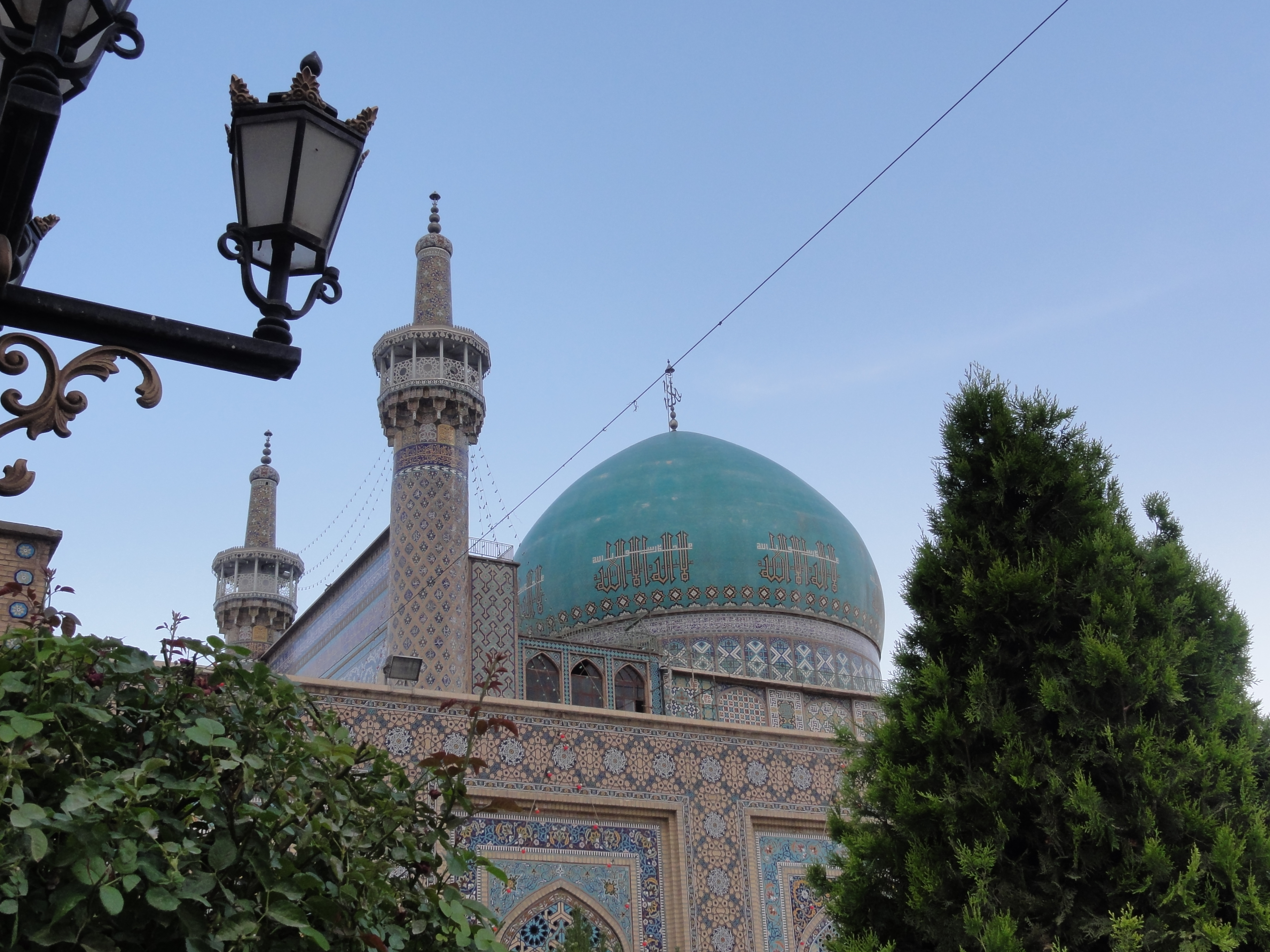

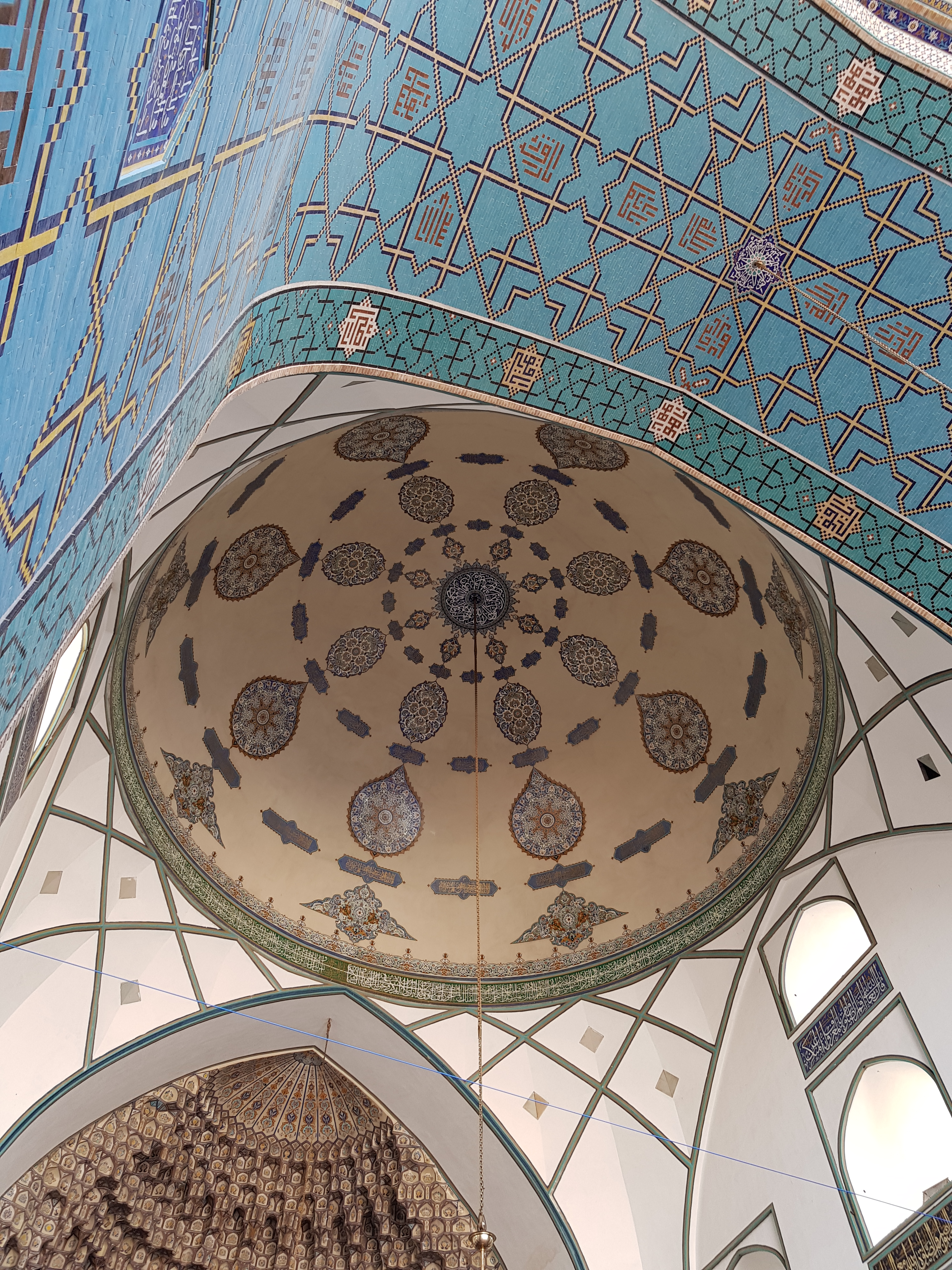

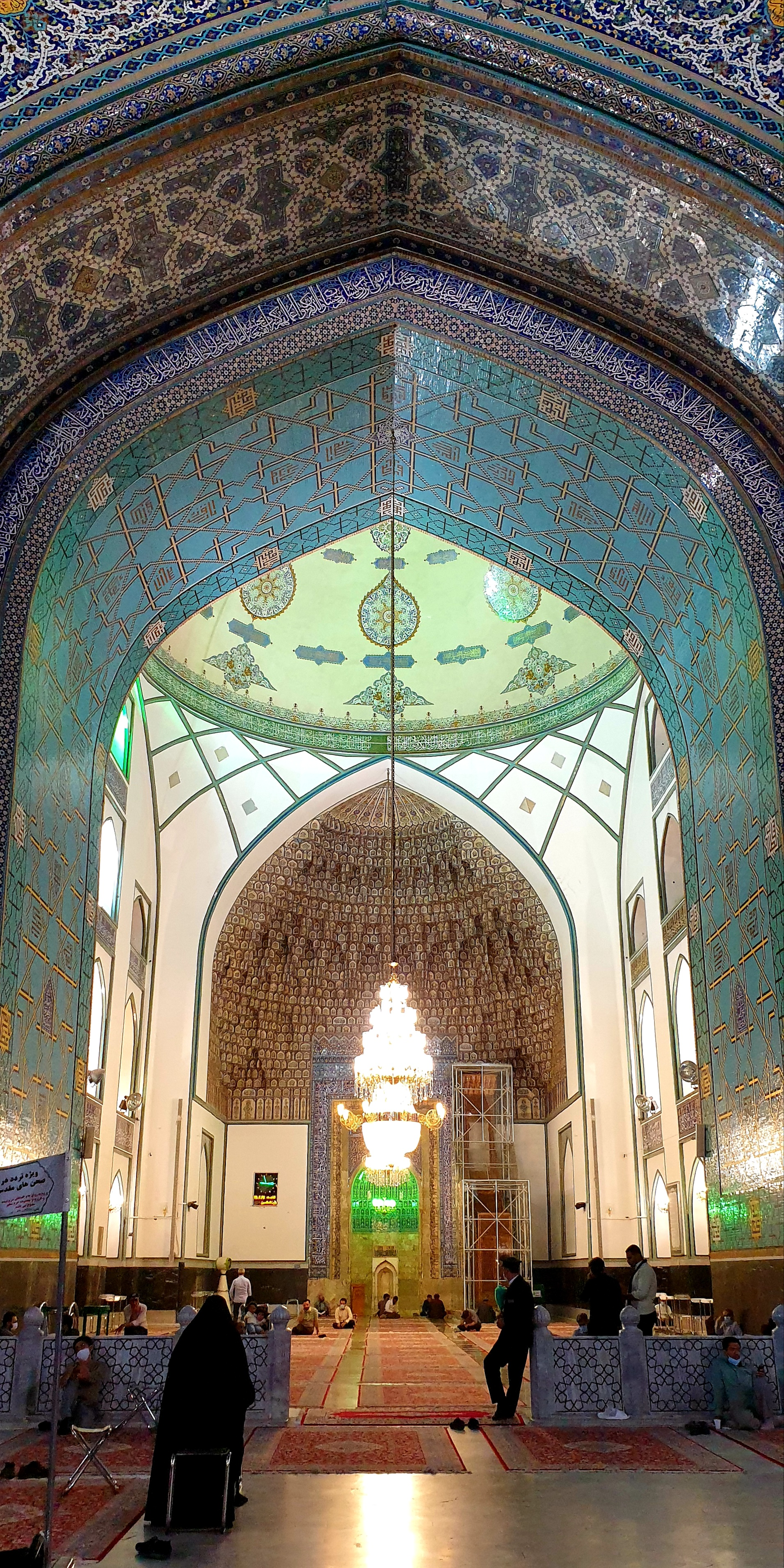

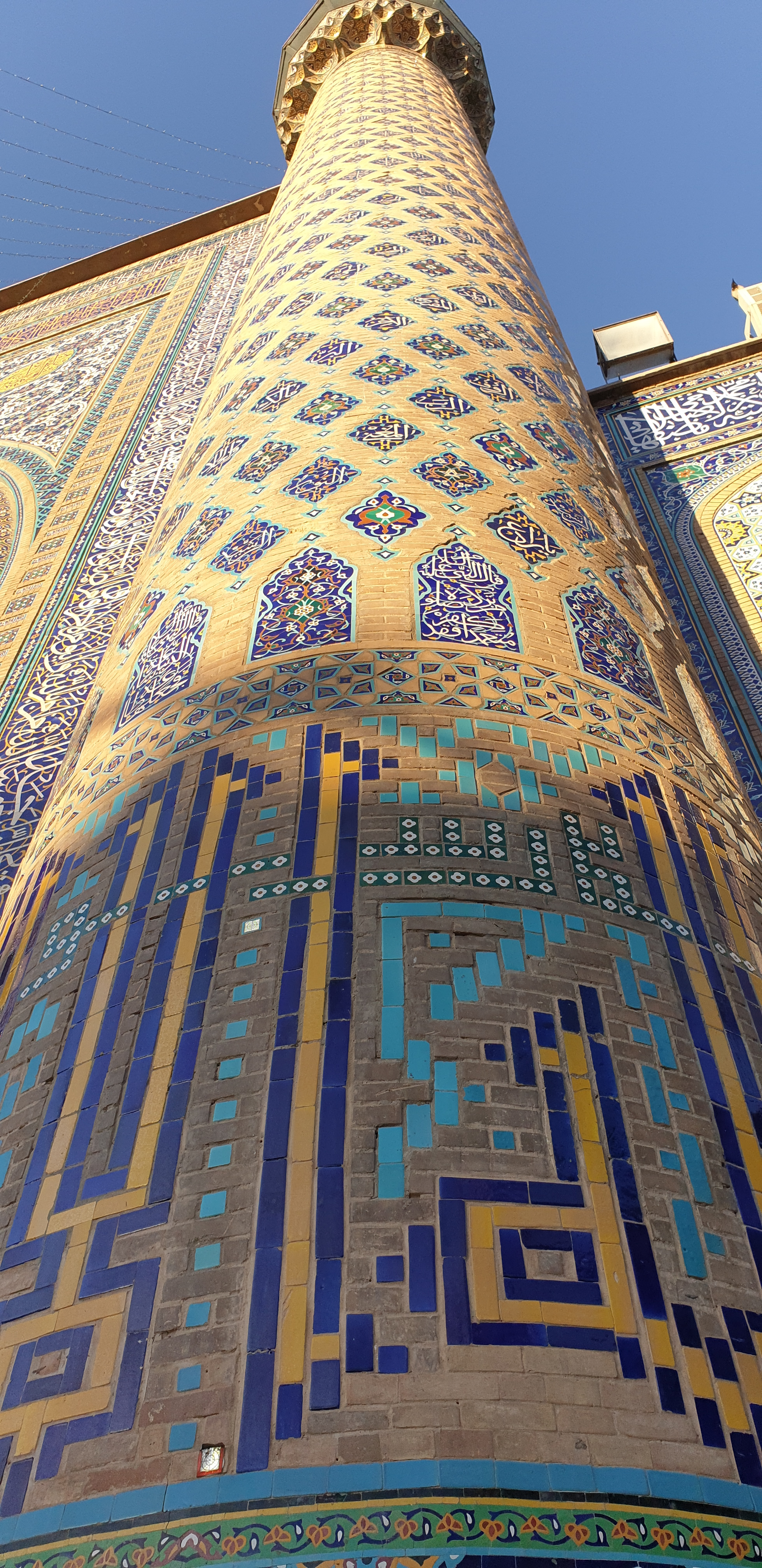

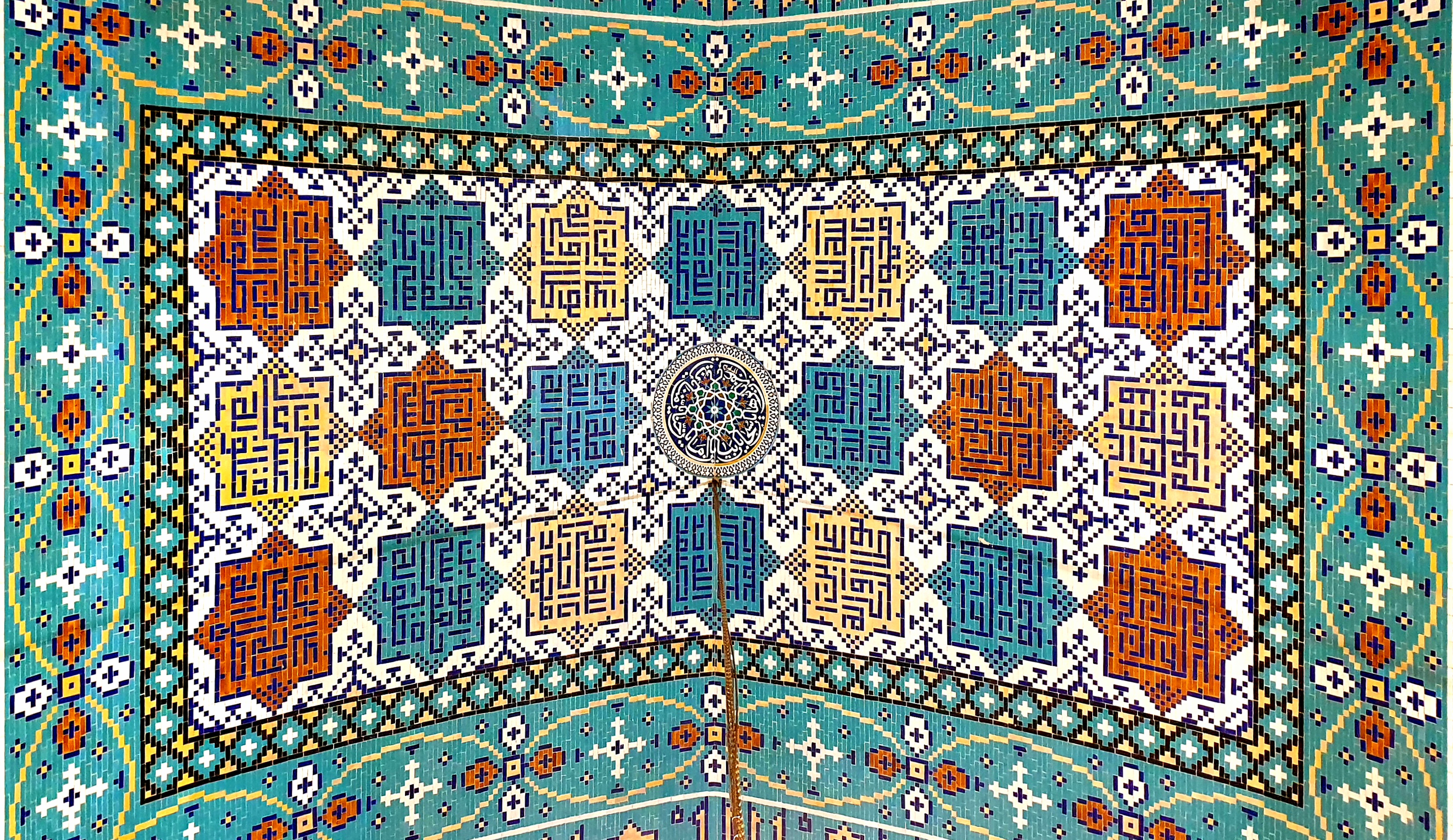

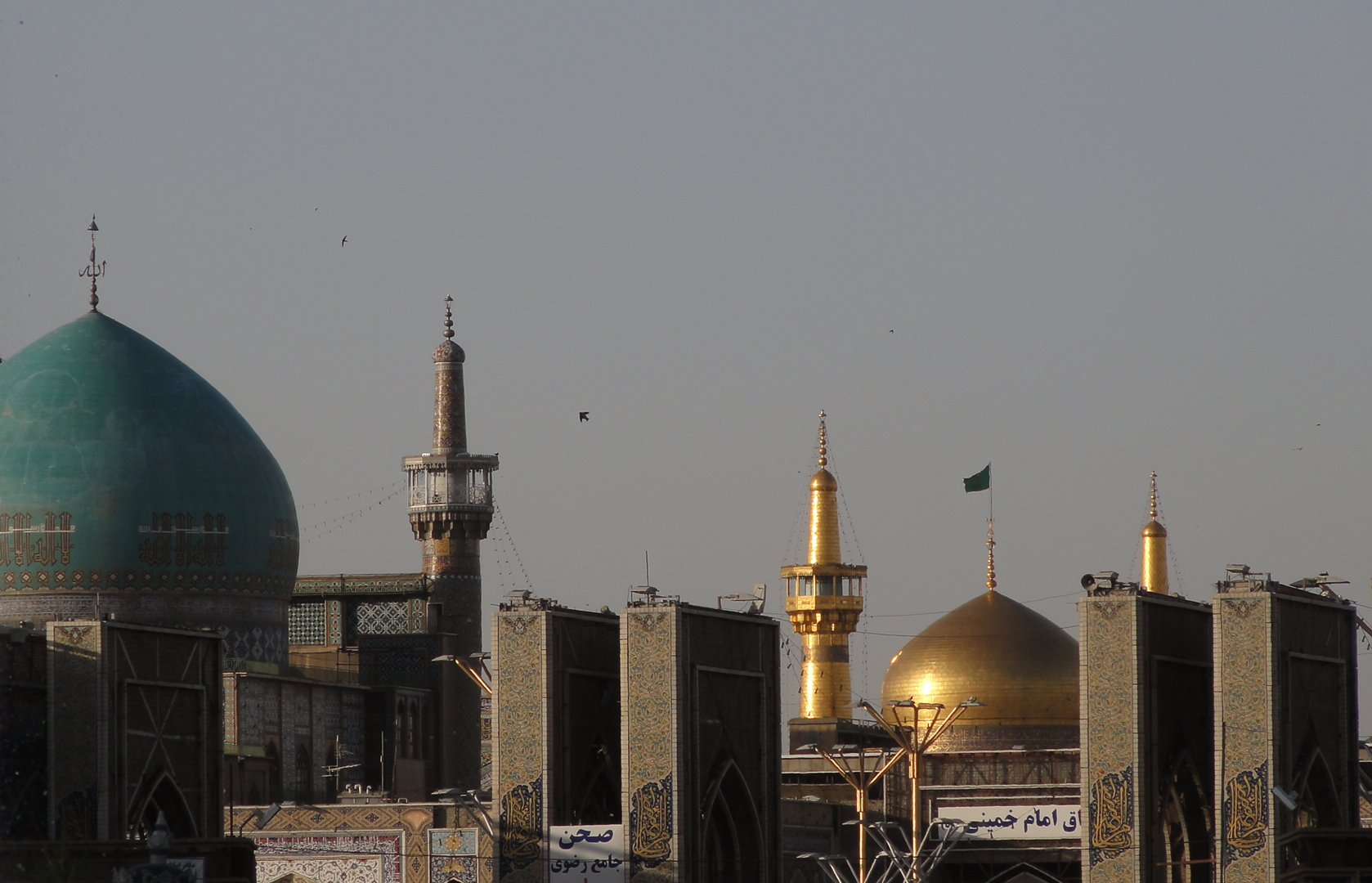

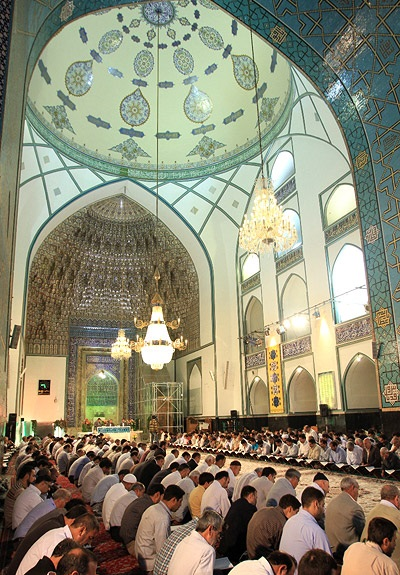

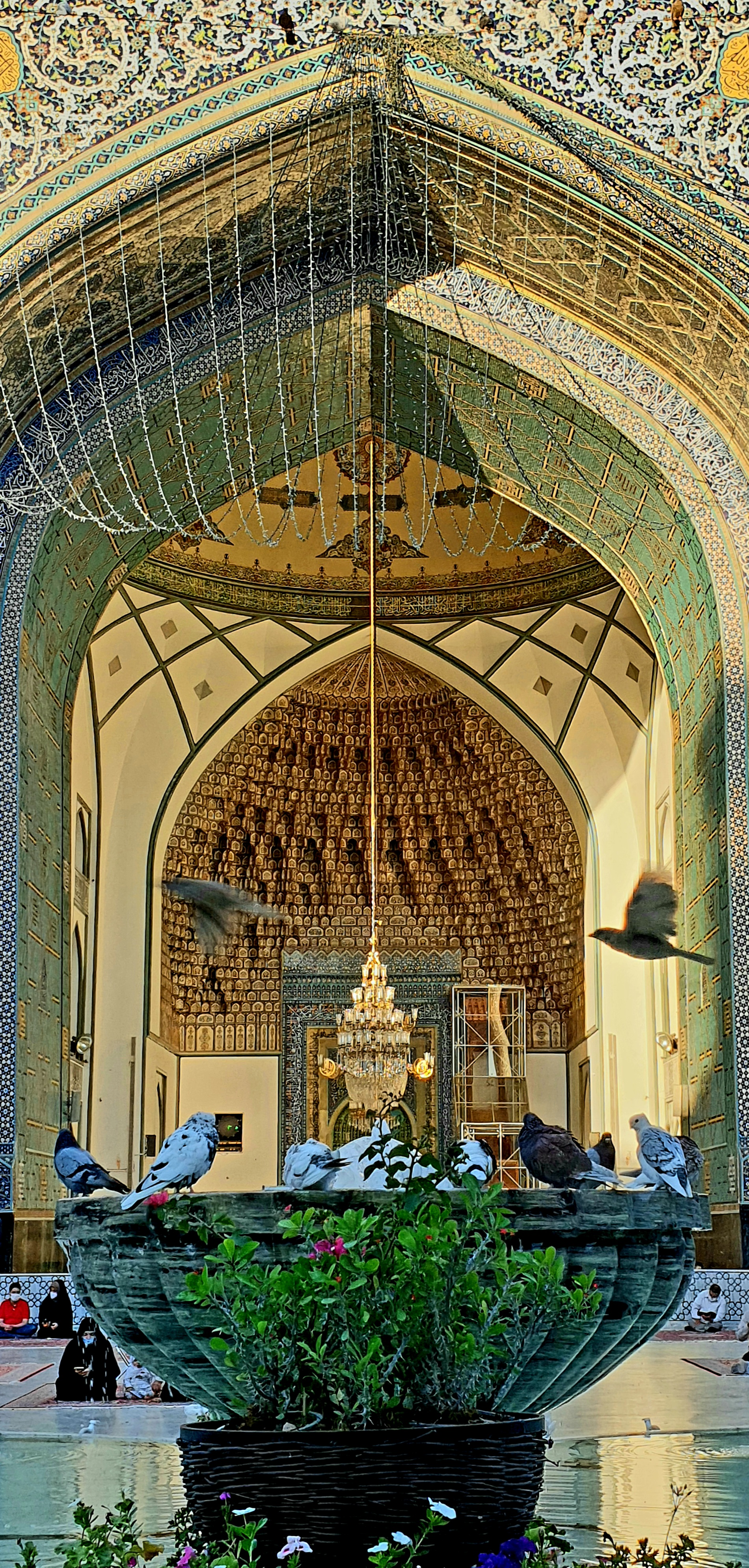

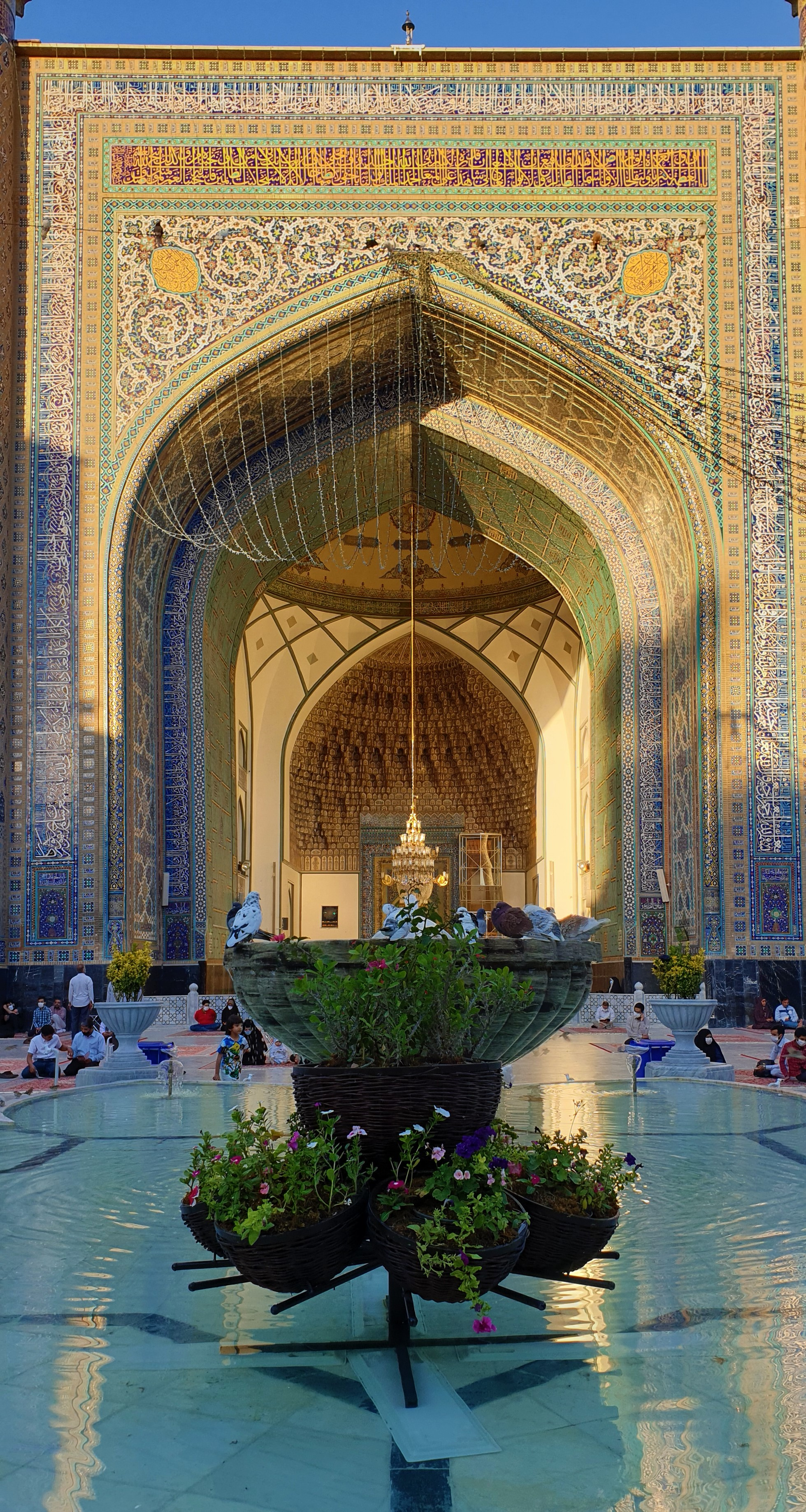

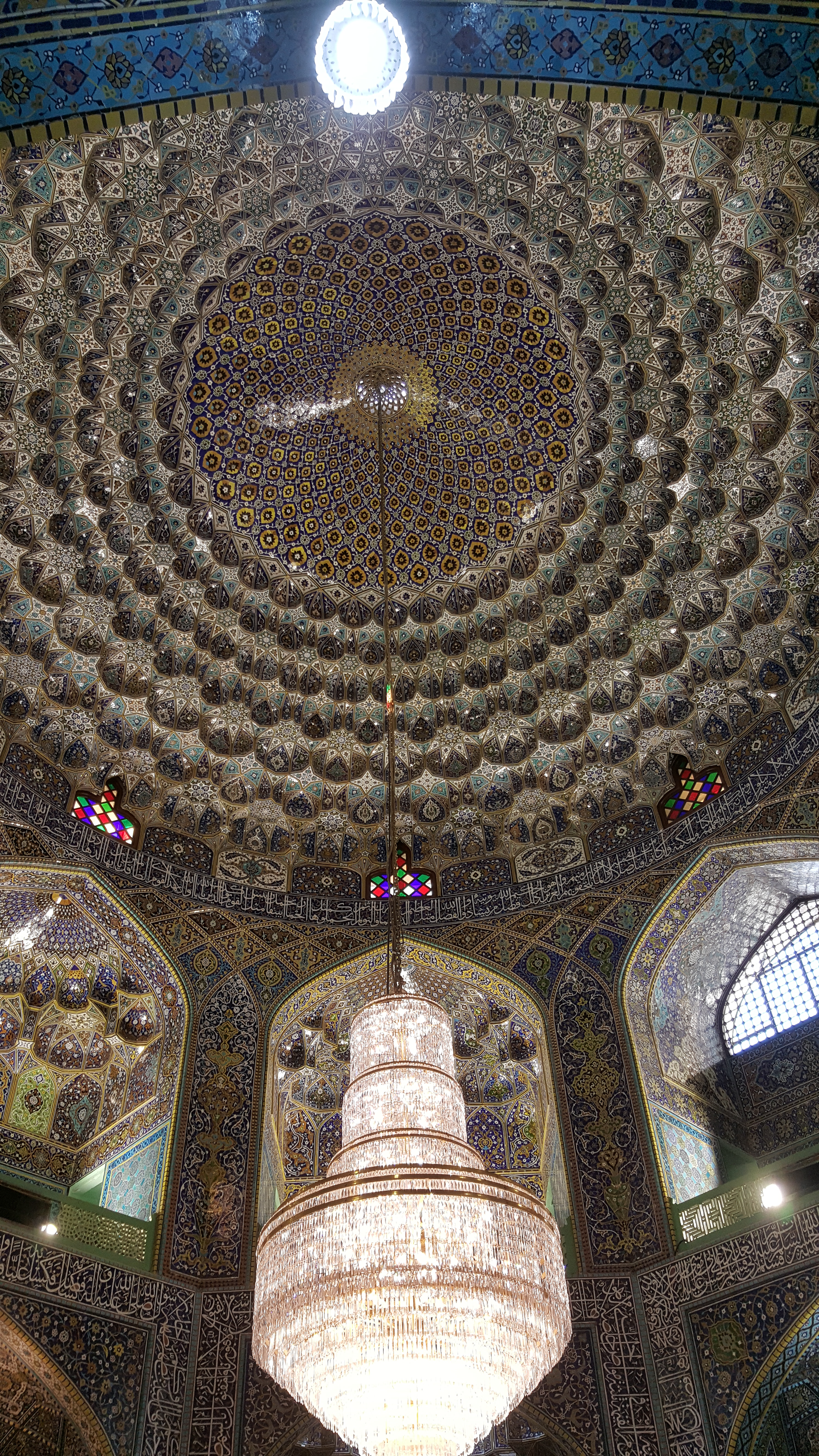

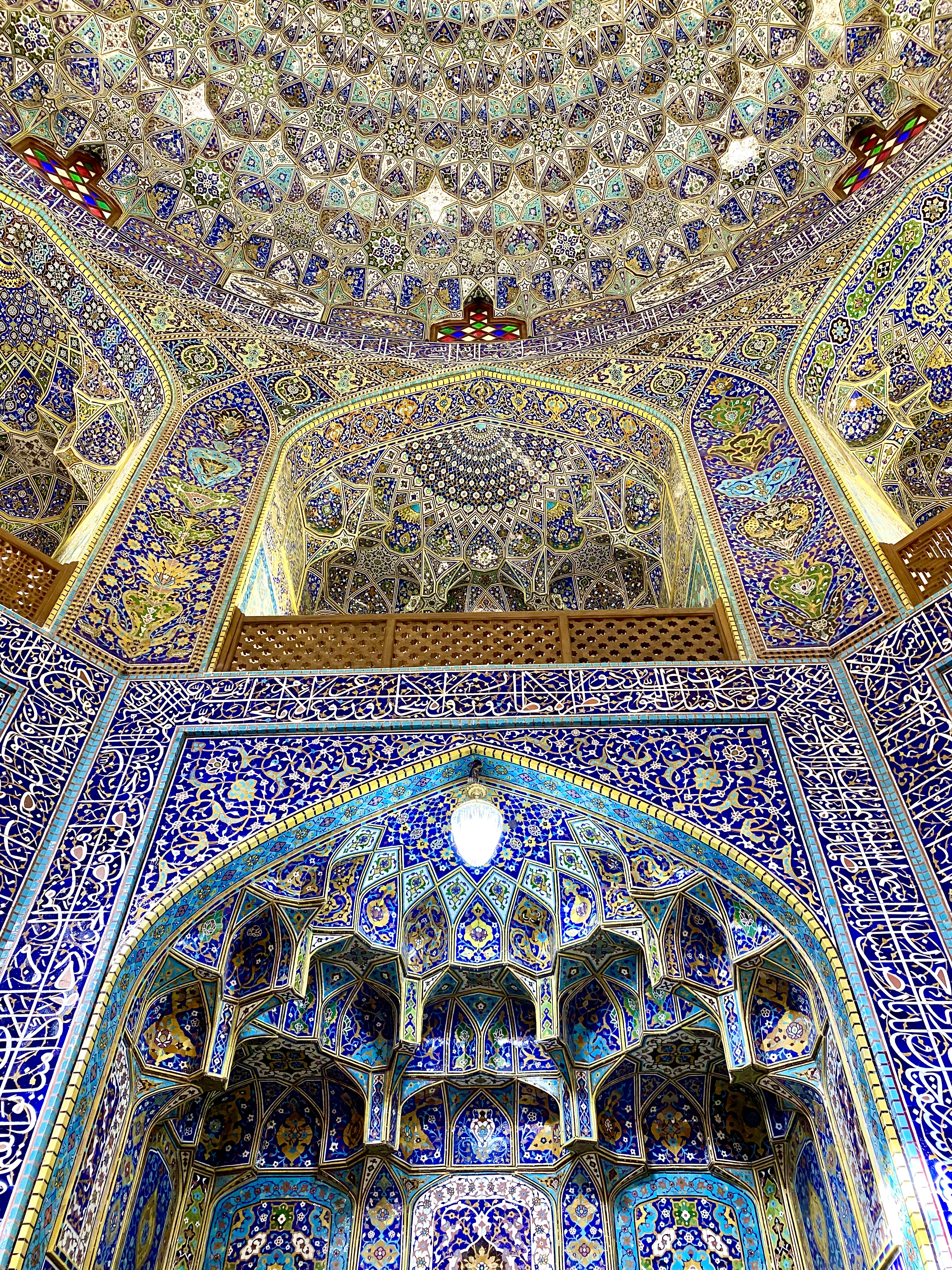

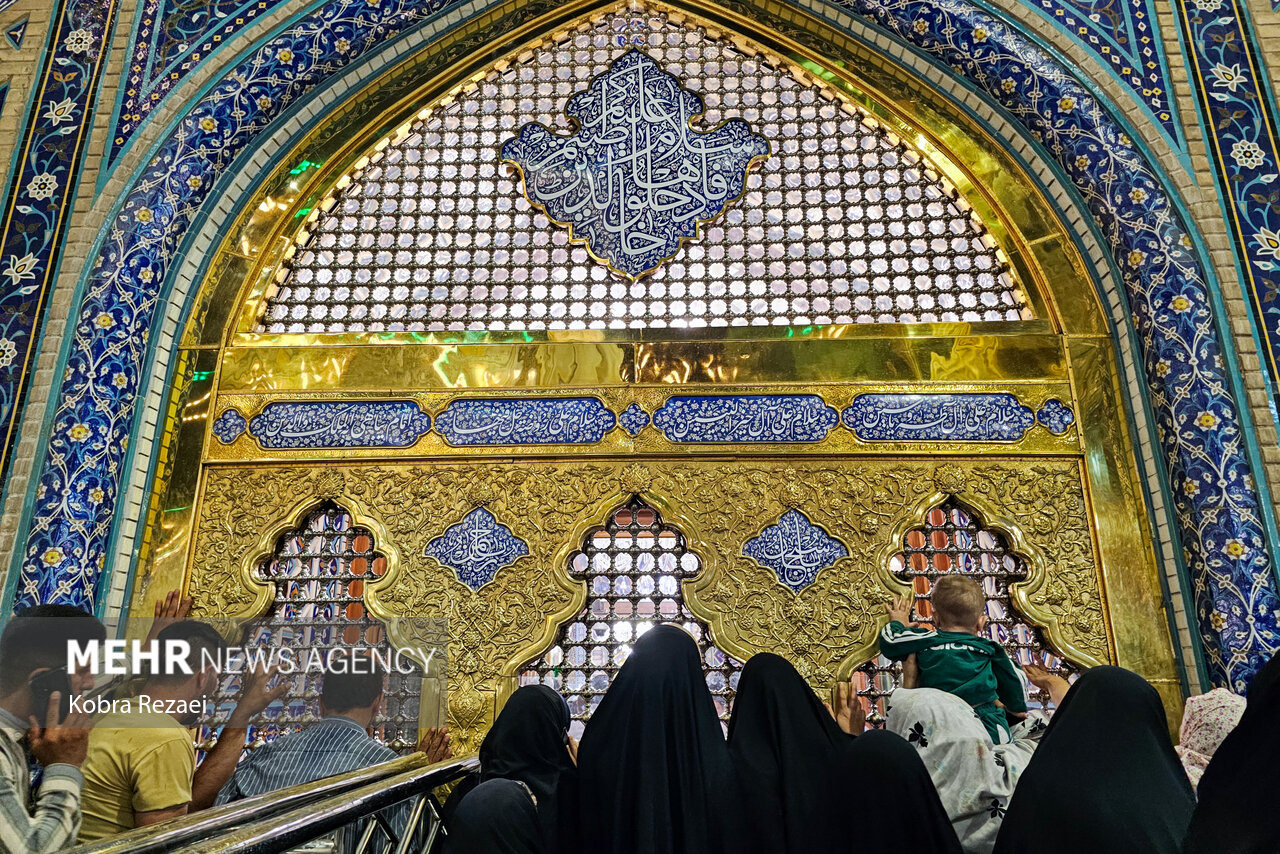

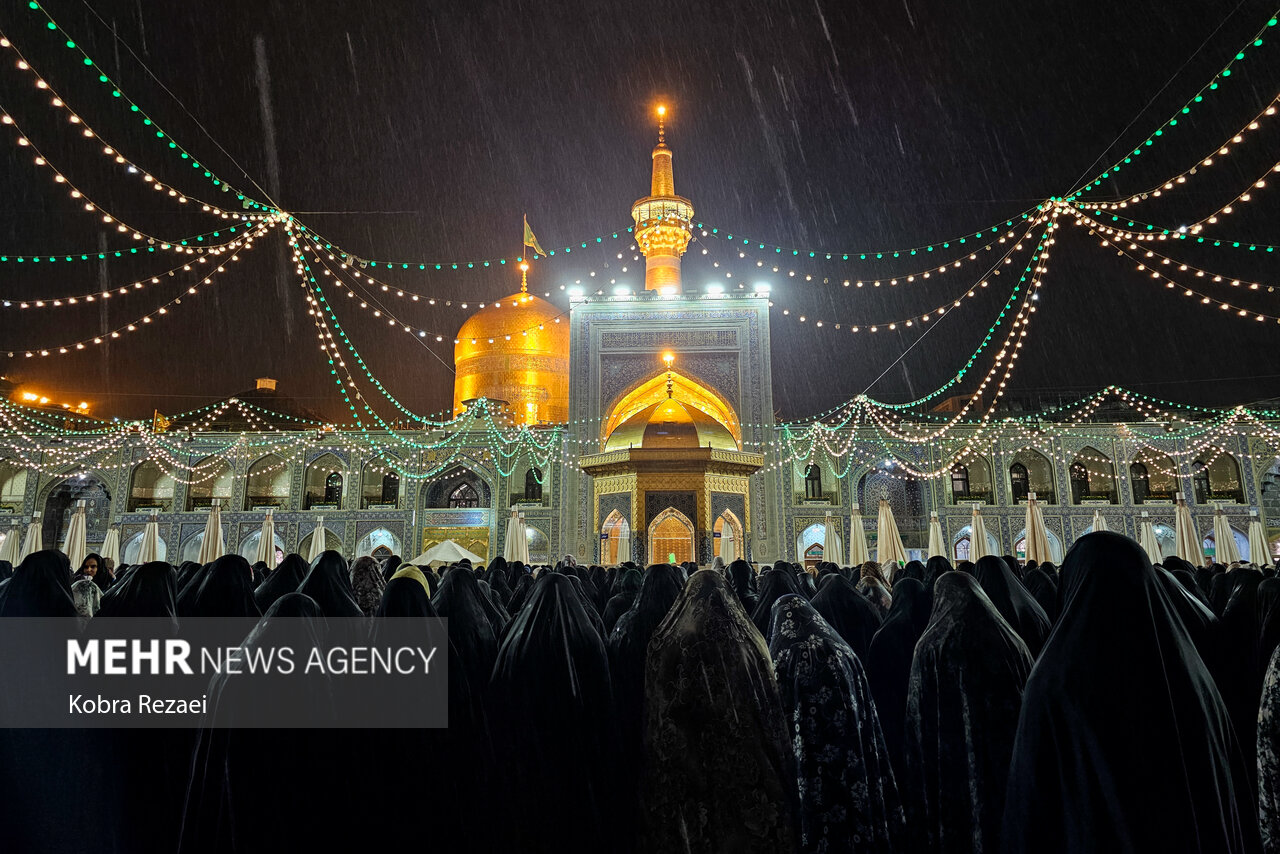

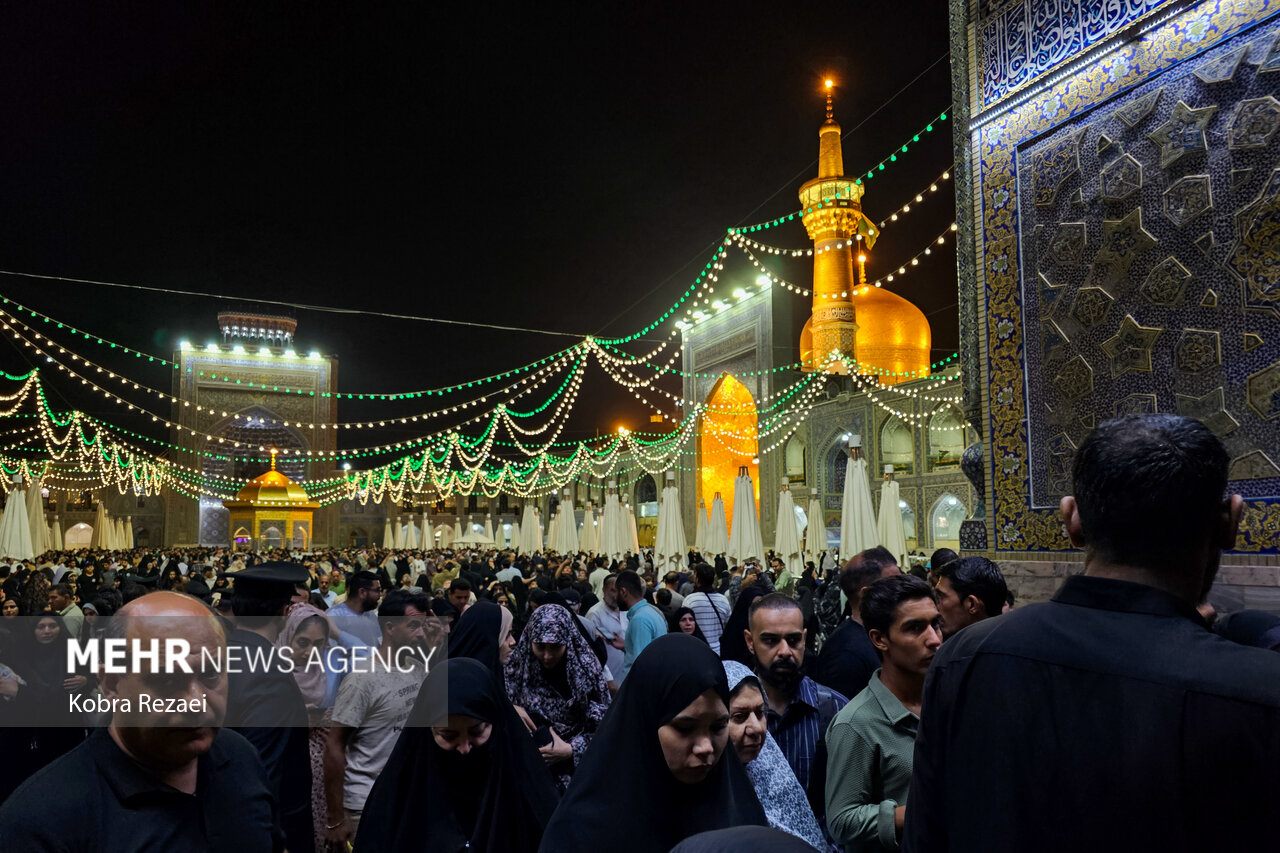

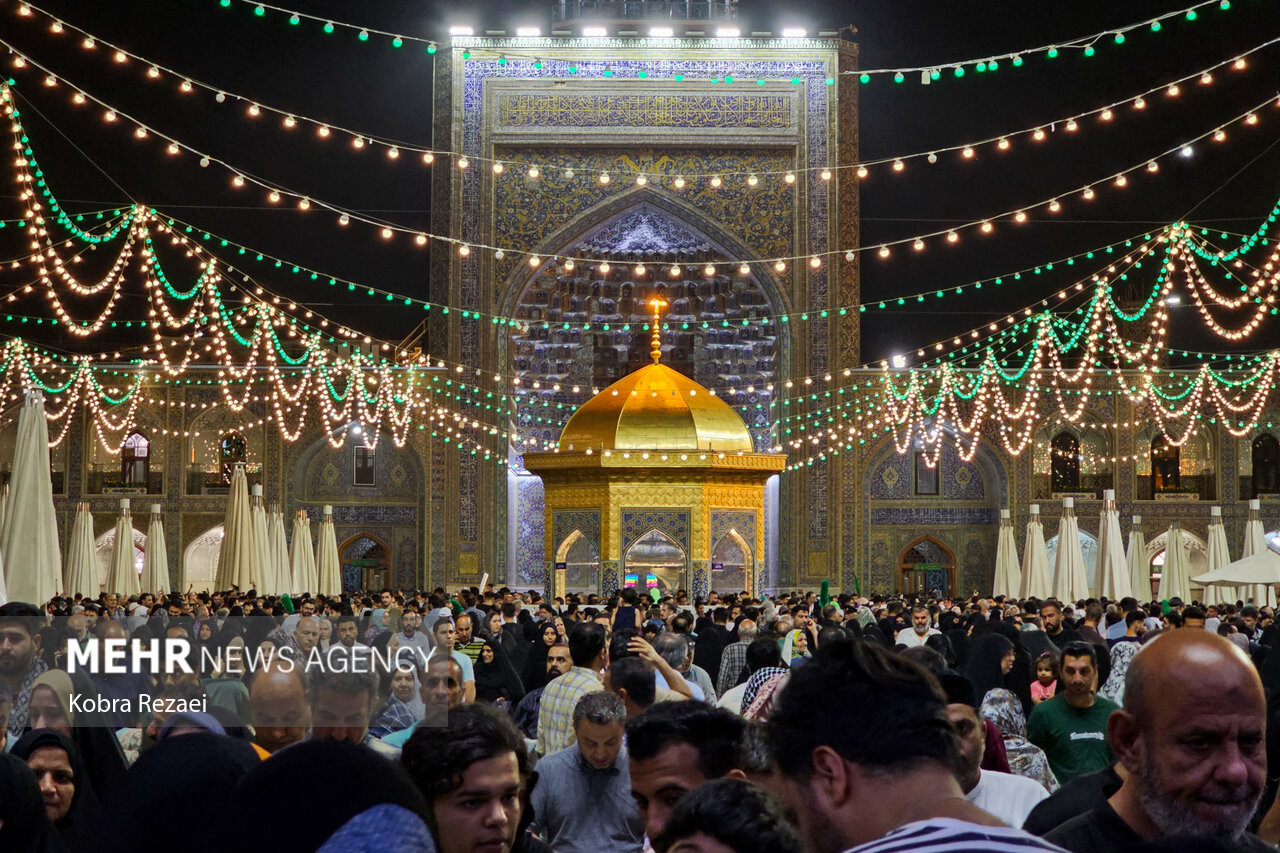

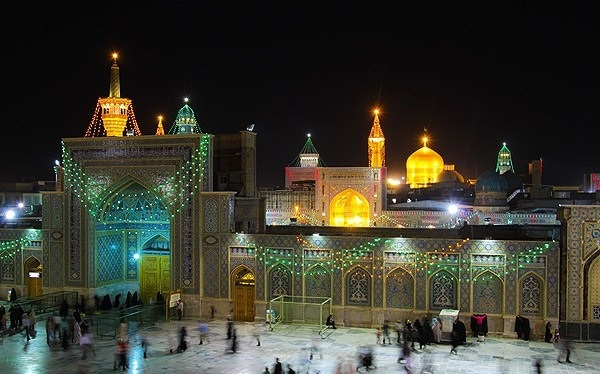

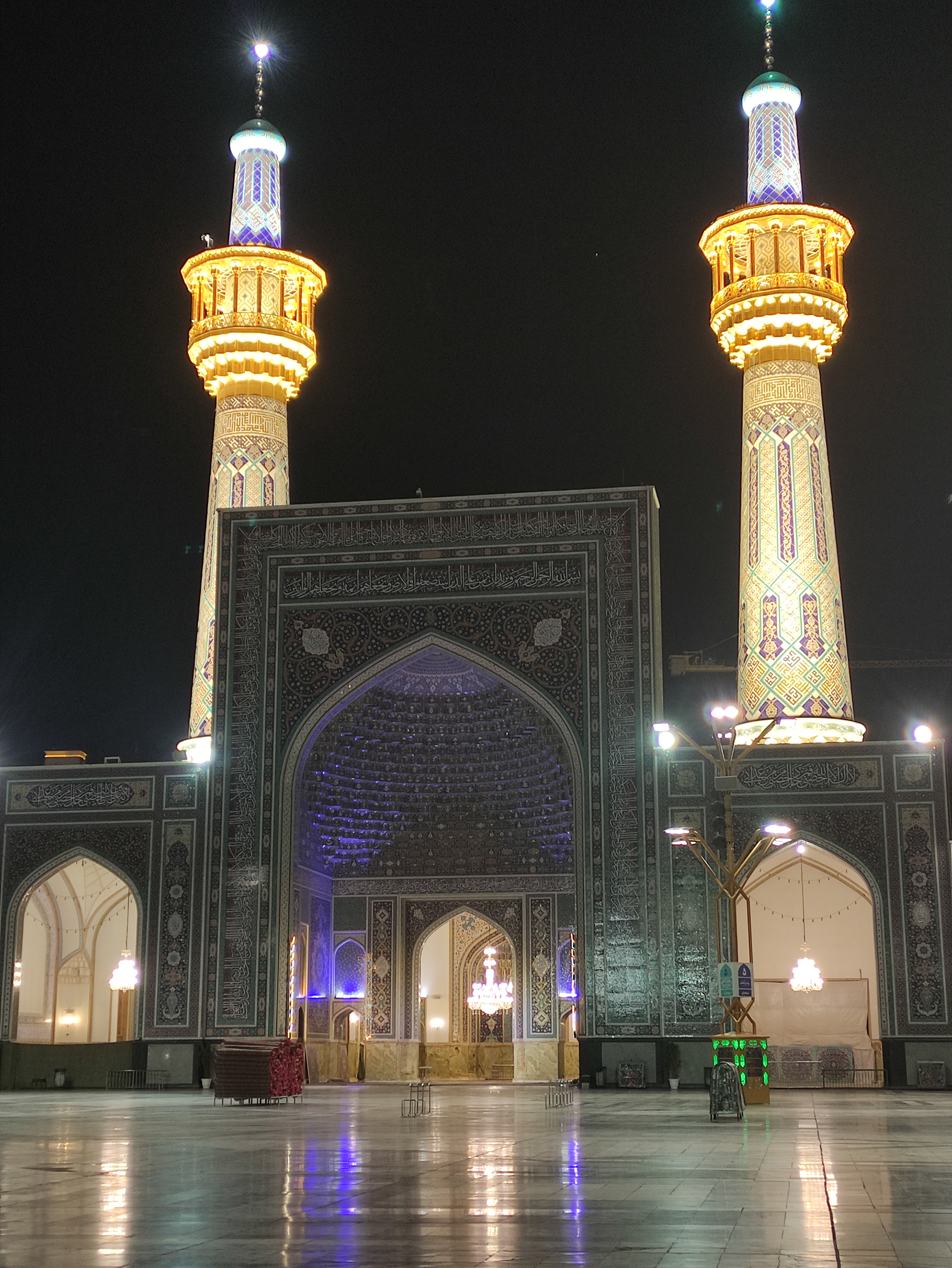

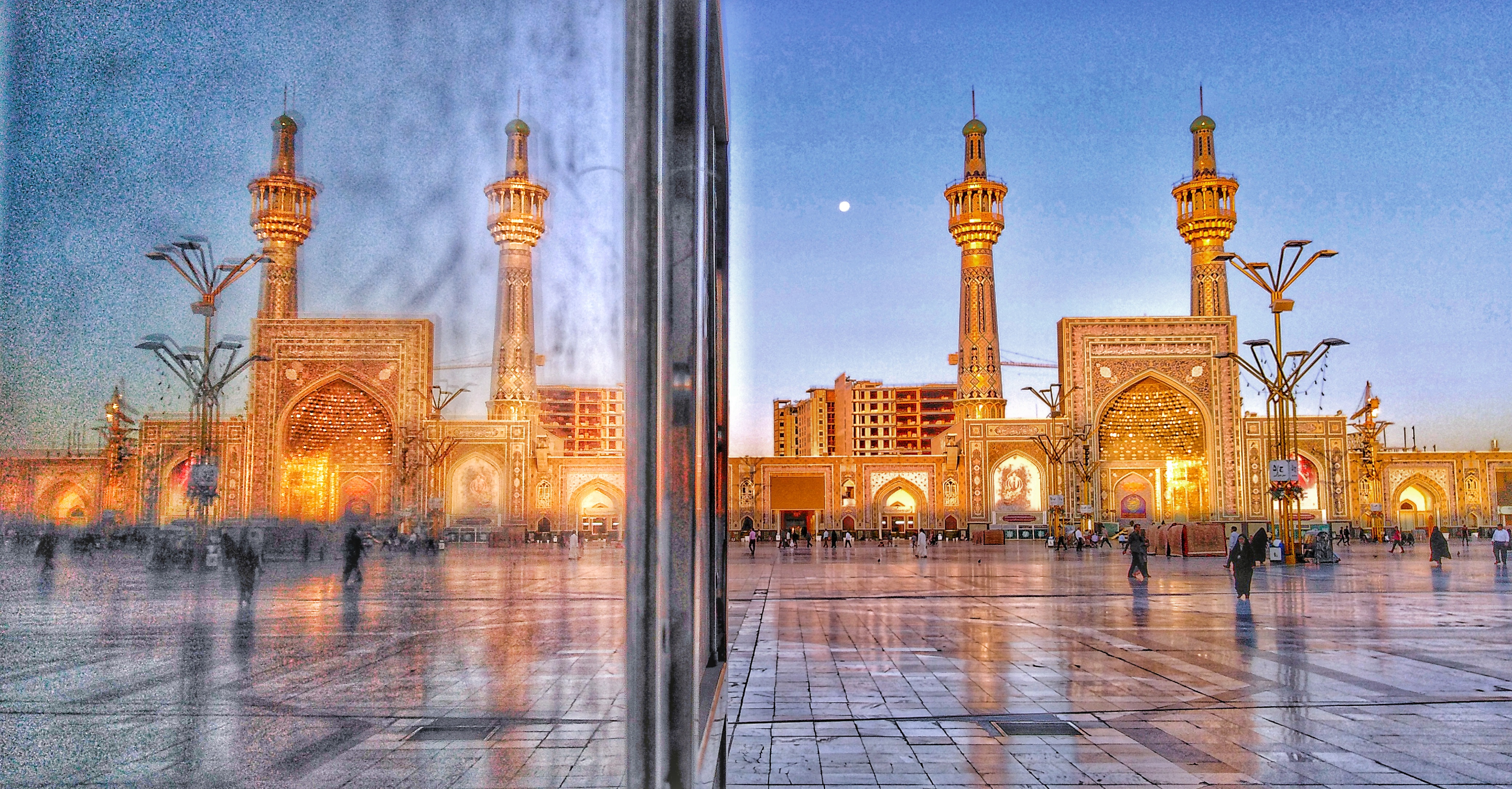

== See also ==
- List of imamzadehs in Iran
- List of mausoleums in Iran
- Shia Islam in Iran
- Holiest sites in Shia Islam
