= Wooden Mosque =

Mosque in Nishapur, Khorasan, Iran

- مسجد چوبی
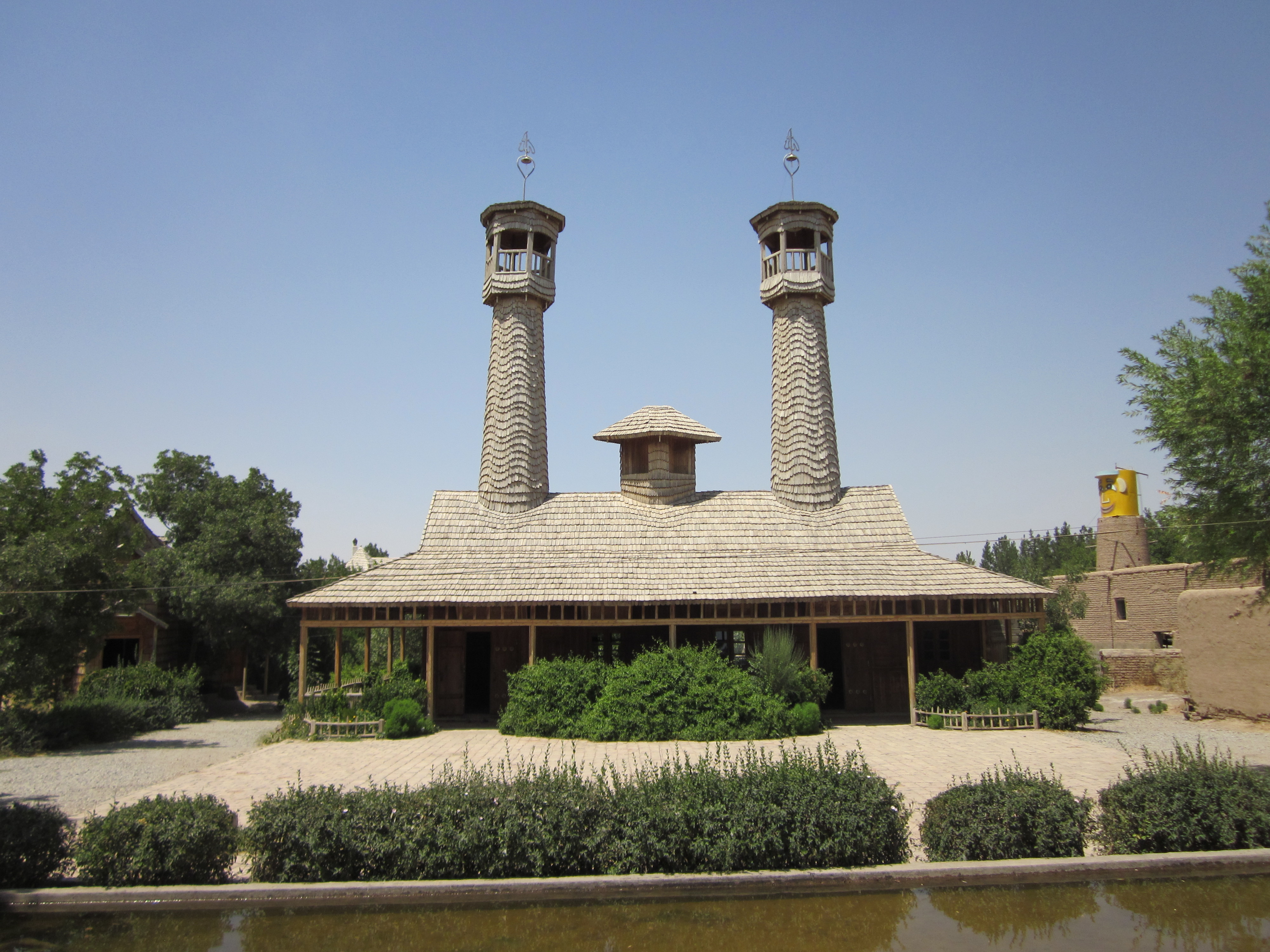

- Location within Iran

Religion
- Affiliation: Shia Islam
- Province: Razavi Khorasan
- Ecclesiastical or organisational status: Open to the public
- Status: Tourist attraction

Location
- Location: Choubin, Nishapur, Khorasan, Iran
- Municipality: Nishapur
- Country: Iran
- Coordinates: 36°06′33″N 58°52′18″E

Architecture
- Type: Mosque
- Creator: Hamid Mojtahedi
- Completed: 2000

Specifications
- Minaret height: 12 metres (39 ft)
- Materials: Wood

The Wooden Mosque (Persian: مسجد چوبی, romanized: Masjed-e Choobi) is a mosque situated in the village of Choubin, south-east of the city of Nishapur, Iran. This mosque is built completely of wood.

== Features ==
Its construction, completed in two years, utilized 40 tons of wood.

== Gallery ==
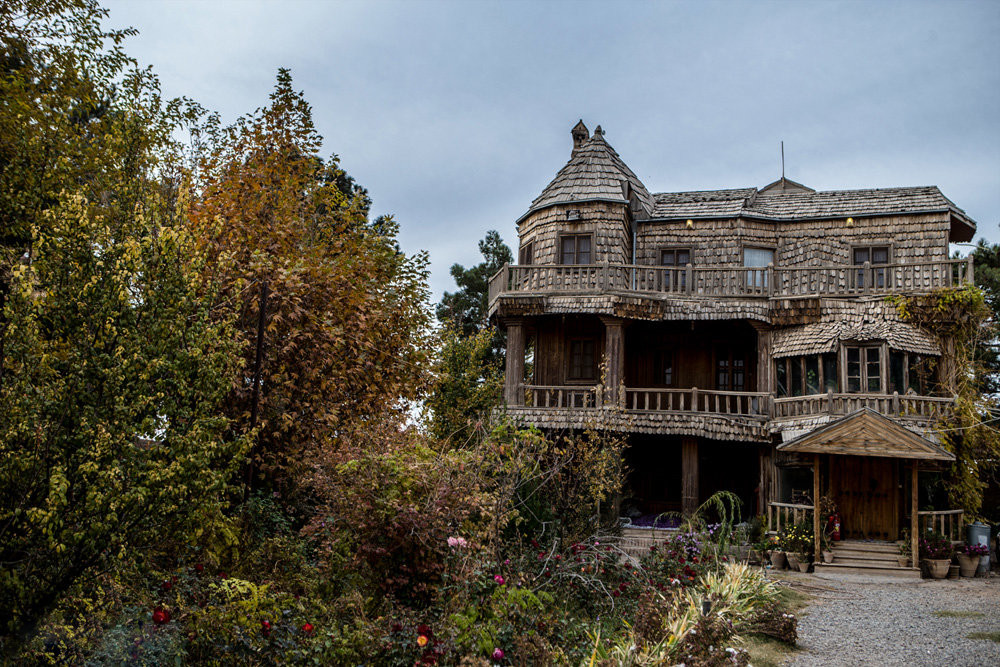
Other buildings

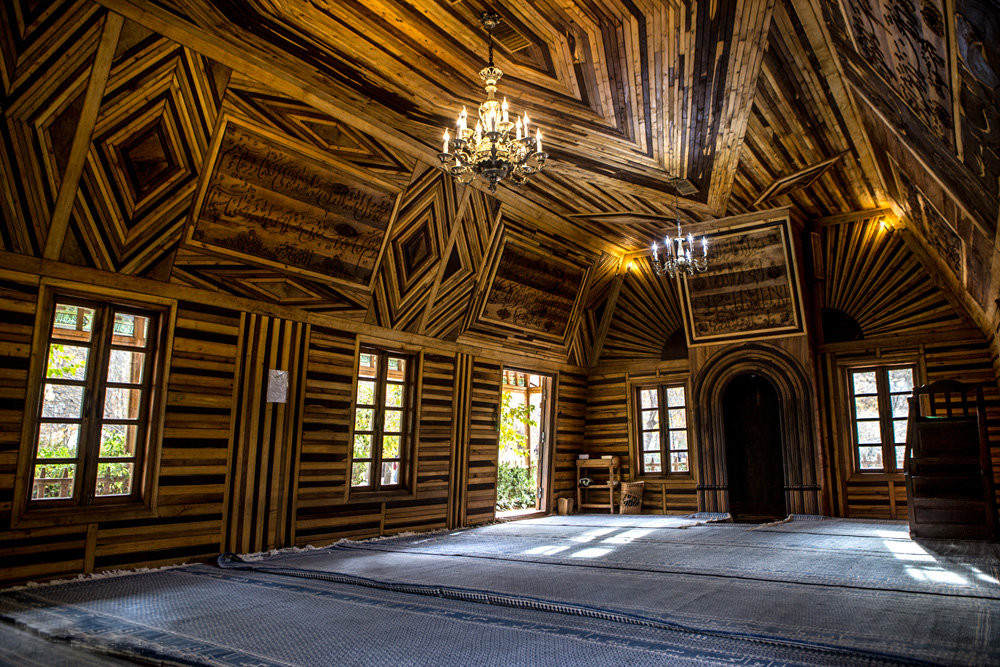
The interior of the wooden mosque

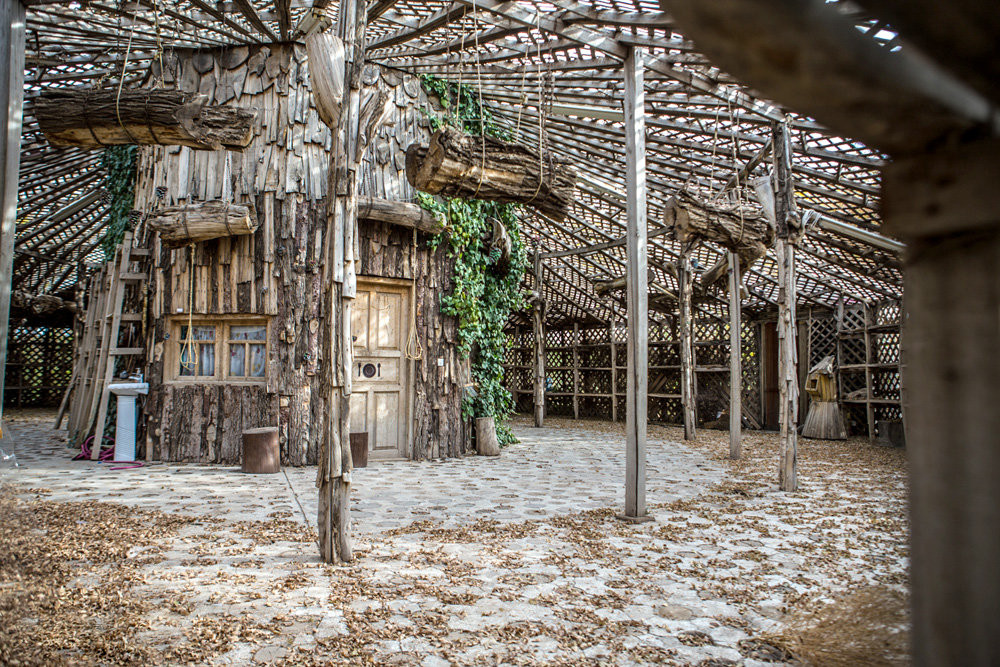
Other buildings

== See also ==
- Shia Islam in Iran
- List of mosques in Iran
