= Abdullah ibn Umar Mosque =

Mosque in Dalahu, Kermanshah, Iran

- مَسجِد عَبْد ٱلله ٱبْن عُمَر
- The mosque with one minaret, in 2006

- Location of the mosque in Iran

Religion
- Affiliation: Sunni Islam
- Ecclesiastical or organizational status: Mosque
- Status: Active

Location
- Location: Dalahu County, Kermanshah Province
- Country: Iran
- Interactive map of Abdullah ibn Umar Mosque
- Coordinates: 34°29′N 46°01′E

Architecture
- Type: Mosque architecture
- Completed: Rashidun Caliphate

Specifications
- Dome: One (maybe more)
- Minaret: One
- Materials: Bricks

Iran National Heritage List
- Official name: Abdullah ibn Umar Mosque
- Type: Built
- Designated: 7 June 2006
- Reference no.: 15495
- Conservation organization: Cultural Heritage, Handicrafts and Tourism Organization of Iran

The Abdullah ibn Umar Mosque (Arabic: مَسجِد عَبْدُ ٱلله ٱبْن عُمَر, romanized: Masjid ʿAbdullāh ibn ʿUmar) is a Sunni mosque located in Dalahu County, near Rijab, in the province of Kermanshah, Iran.

The 7th-century mosque was completed during the Rashidun Caliphate era. The mosque was added to the Iran National Heritage List on 7 June 2006, administered by the Cultural Heritage, Handicrafts and Tourism Organization of Iran.

== See also ==
- Sunni Islam in Iran
- List of mosques in Iran
- Oldest mosques in Iran
