= Mirpanj Mosque =

Mosque in Shabestar, Khamaneh, Iran

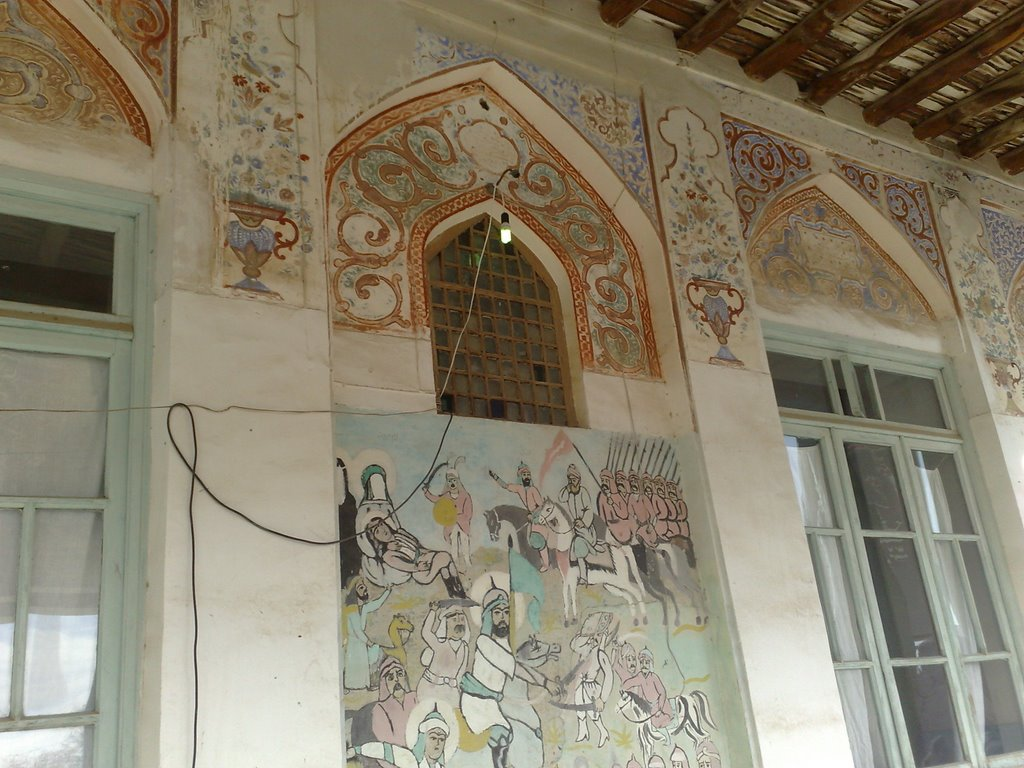
- The mosque exterior in 2016

- Location of the mosque in Iran

Religion
- Affiliation: Shia Islam
- Ecclesiastical or organisational status: Mosque
- Status: Active

Location
- Location: Shabestar County, Khamaneh, East Azerbaijan
- Country: Iran
- Coordinates: 38°11′41″N 45°37′41″E

Architecture
- Type: Mosque architecture
- Style: Qajar
- Completed: Qajar era
- Dome: One (maybe more)

The Mirpanj Mosque is a Shi'ite mosque, located in Shabestar County, Khamaneh, in the province of East Azerbaijan, Iran. The mosque was built during the Qajar era.

== See also ==
- Shia Islam in Iran
- List of mosques in Iran
