= Hajj Shahbazkhan Mosque =

Mosque in Kermanshah, Iran

- مسجد حاج شهبازخان
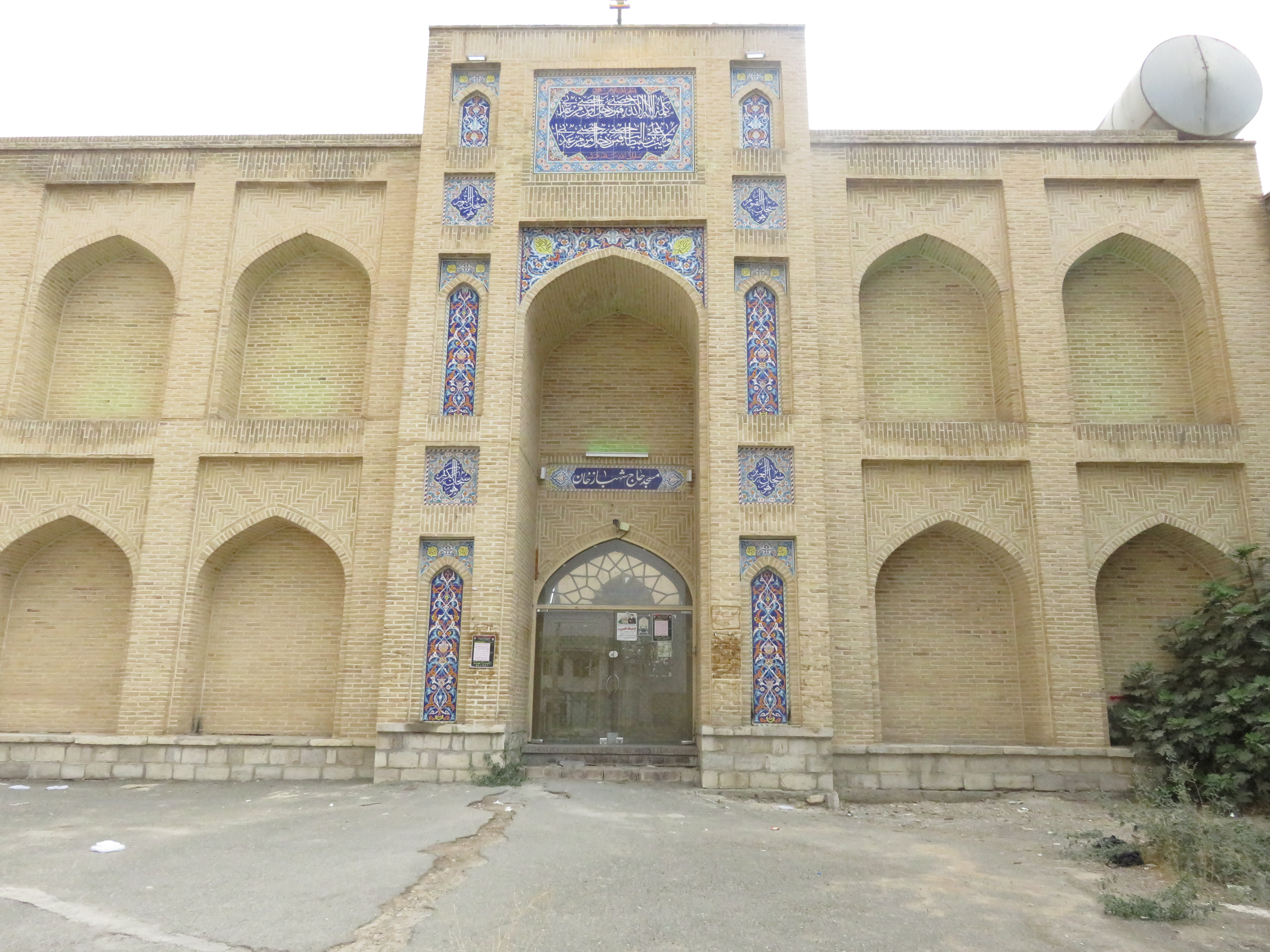
- The mosque facade in 2018

- Location of the mosque in Iran

Religion
- Affiliation: Shia Islam
- Ecclesiastical or organizational status: Mosque
- Status: Active

Location
- Location: Kermanshah, Kermanshah province
- Country: Iran
- Interactive map of Hajj Shahbazkhan Mosque
- Coordinates: 34°18′53″N 47°04′05″E

Architecture
- Type: Mosque architecture
- Completed: 1820
- Materials: Stone; bricks; mortar

Iran National Heritage List
- Official name: Haj Shahbazkhan Mosque
- Type: Built
- Designated: 23 September 2003
- Reference no.: 10444
- Conservation organization: Cultural Heritage, Handicrafts and Tourism Organization of Iran

The Haj Shahbazkhan Mosque (Persian: مسجد حاج شهبازخان; Arabic: مسجد الحاج شهباز خان), also known as the Haj Shahbaz Khan Mosque, is a mosque located in the Ojagh Crossroads of the city of Kermanshah, in the province of Kermanshah, Iran.

== Overview ==
The mosque is located in a basement that has a prayer hall and chambers around its courtyard. The chambers of the mosque were places for teaching seminary students.

The mosque has suffered damage as a result of earthquakes in the region.

The mosque was added to the Iran National Heritage List on 23 September 2003, administered by the Cultural Heritage, Handicrafts and Tourism Organization of Iran.

== See also ==
- Shia Islam in Iran
- List of mosques in Iran
