= Hajj Samad Khan Mosque =

Mosque in Rasht, Iran

- مسجد حاج صمد خان
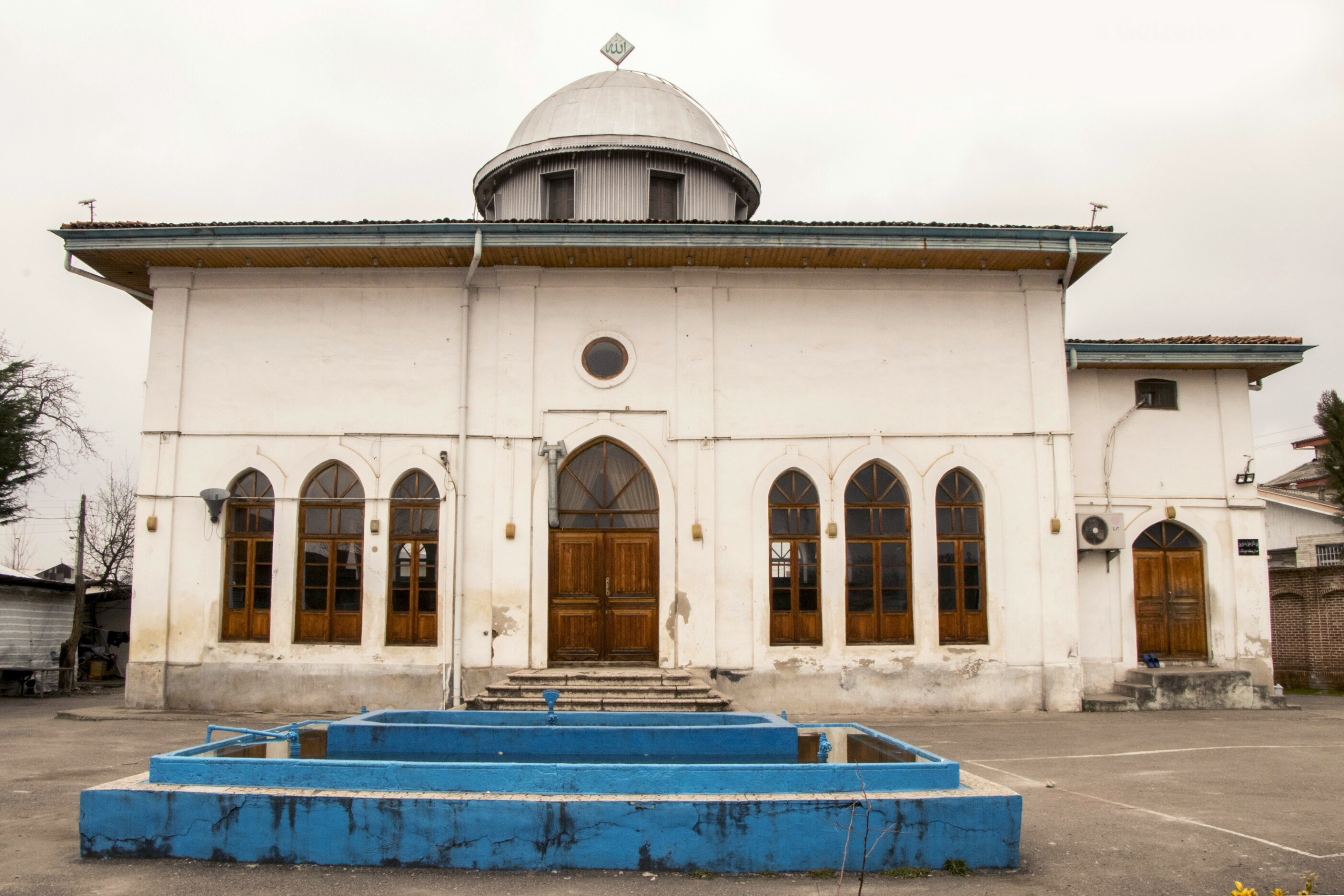
- The mosque exterior in 2017

- Location of the mosque in Iran

Religion
- Affiliation: Shia Islam
- Ecclesiastical or organizational status: Mosque
- Status: Active

Location
- Location: Rasht, Gilan Province
- Country: Iran
- Interactive map of Hajj Samad Khan Mosque
- Coordinates: 37°16′54″N 49°35′18″E

Architecture
- Type: Mosque architecture
- Completed: Qajar era
- Dome: One (maybe more)

Iran National Heritage List
- Official name: Hajj Samad Khan Mosque
- Type: Built
- Designated: unknown
- Reference no.: 2364
- Conservation organization: Cultural Heritage, Handicrafts and Tourism Organization of Iran

The Hajj Samad Khan Mosque (Persian: مسجد حاج صمد خان; Arabic: مسجد الحاج صمد خان) is a mosque, located in Saadi Street, Rasht, in the province of Gilan, Iran. The mosque was completed in the Qajar era.

The mosque was added to the Iran National Heritage List, administered by the Cultural Heritage, Handicrafts and Tourism Organization of Iran.

== See also ==
- Shia Islam in Iran
- List of mosques in Iran
