= Mohammad Rasul-Allah Mosque =

Mosque in Shiraz, Fars, Iran

Religion
- Affiliation: Shia Islam
- Ecclesiastical or organizational status: Mosque
- Status: Active

Location
- Location: Shiraz, Fars
- Country: Iran

Architecture
- Type: Mosque architecture
- Completed: 2016

Specifications
- Capacity: 450 worshippers
- Interior area: 650 m^{2} (7,000 sq ft)
- Minaret: One
- Materials: Bricks

The Mohammad Rasul-Allah Mosque is a mosque located within the grounds of the Namazi hospital in Shiraz, in the province of Fars, Iran.

== Overview ==
The mosque was designed without a traditional courtyard; however, it integrates the elements of traditional Islamic architecture combined with Persian specifics and modern sustainable methods including elements of modern design. A minaret is located adjacent to the two entrances, that are connected to a riwaq or arcade, formed by a perforated curtain wall with Islamic geometric patterns. The interior of the mosque features calligraphy, stucco work, and muqarnas.

The mosque is built around an old prayer hall surrounded by trees, which used to be part of a garden on the hospital site. As of 2023, the trees were estimated to be 70 years old.

== See also ==
- Shia Islam in Iran
- List of mosques in Iran
