= Agha Zia ol Din Mosque =

Mosque in Arak, Markazi, Iran

- مسجد آقا ضیاءالدین
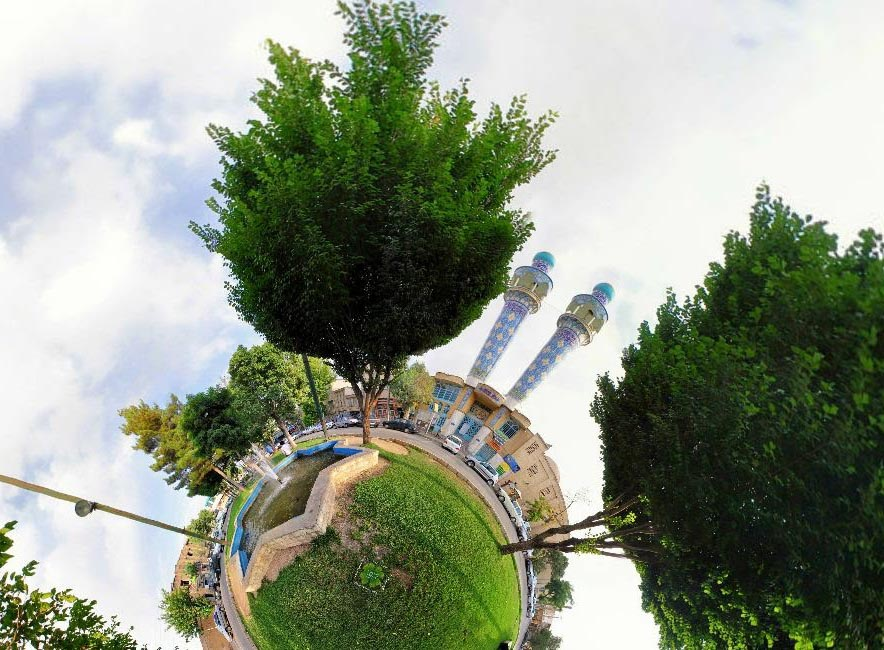
- 360° panoramic view of the mosque, in 2011

- Location of the mosque in Iran

Religion
- Affiliation: Shia Islam
- Ecclesiastical or organizational status: Mosque
- Status: Active

Location
- Location: Arak, Markazi Province
- Country: Iran
- Interactive map of Agha Zia ol Din Mosque
- Coordinates: 34°05′37″N 49°41′34″E

Architecture
- Type: Mosque architecture
- Style: Qajar
- Completed: Qajar dynasty

Specifications
- Dome: One
- Minaret: Two

The Agha Zia ol Din Mosque (Persian: مسجد آقا ضیاءالدین' Arabic: مسجد أغا ضياء الدين), formerly called the Meydan Mosque, is a mosque located in Arak, in the Markazi Province of Iran. The mosque was completed during the Qajar era.

== See also ==
- Shia Islam in Iran
- List of mosques in Iran
