= Sheikh Fayz Mosque =

Demolished Sunni mosque in Mashhad, Razavi Khorasan, Iran

Sheikh Faydh Mosque

Religion
- Affiliation: Sunni Islam (former)
- Ecclesiastical or organizational status: Mosque
- Status: Demolished

Location
- Location: Mashhad, Razavi Khorasan province
- Country: Iran

Architecture
- Type: Mosque architecture
- Demolished: 1993

The Sheikh Faydh Mosque was a former ancient Sunni mosque, located in Mashhad, in the province of Razavi Khorasan, Iran. Prior to its demolition in 1993, it was one of the main Shi'ite religious places.

== See also ==
- Islam in Iran
- List of mosques in Iran
- Status of religious freedom in Iran
