= Hajj Safar Ali Mosque =

Mosque in Tabriz, Iran

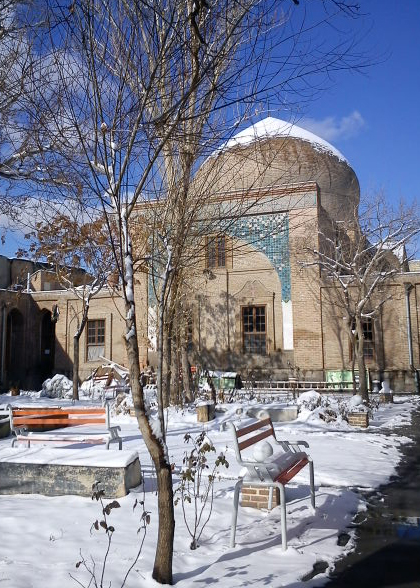
- The mosque in winter 1989

- Location of the mosque in Iran

Religion
- Affiliation: Islam
- Ecclesiastical or organizational status: Mosque
- Status: Active

Location
- Location: Tabriz, East Azerbaijan
- Country: Iran
- Interactive map of Hajj Safar Ali Mosque
- Coordinates: 38°5′0″N 46°17′40″E

Architecture
- Type: Mosque architecture
- Style: Safavid
- Completed: Safavid era
- Dome: One (maybe more)

The Hajj Safar Ali Mosque (Arabic: مسجد الحاج صفر علي; Persian: مسجد حاج صفرعلی) is a mosque located in Tabriz, in the province of East Azerbaijan, Iran. The mosque was built during the Safavid era.

== See also ==
- Islam in Iran
- List of mosques in Iran
