= Hajj Agha Ali Mosque =

Mosque in Kerman, Iran

- مسجد حاج آقاعلی
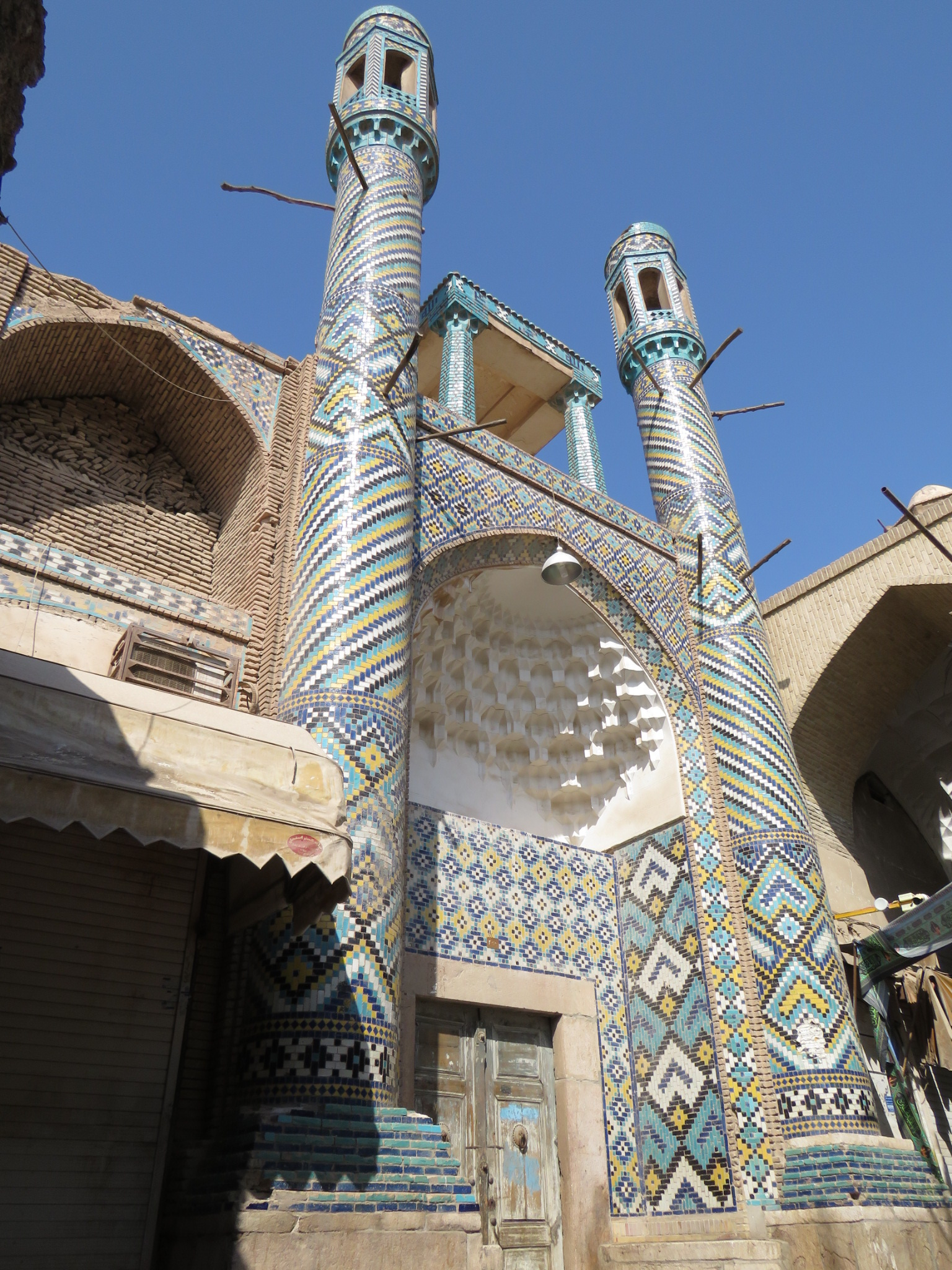
- Detail of the mosque iwan and minarets

- Location of the mosque in Iran

Religion
- Affiliation: Shia Islam
- Ecclesiastical or organisational status: Mosque
- Status: Active

Location
- Location: Shariati Street, Kerman, Kerman Province
- Country: Iran
- Coordinates: 30°17′34″N 57°4′43″E

Architecture
- Type: Mosque architecture
- Style: Qajar
- Completed: 1870 CE; Qajar era

Specifications
- Dome: One (maybe more)
- Minaret: Two

Iran National Heritage List
- Official name: Aqa Ali Mosque
- Type: Mosque
- Designated: 1966
- Reference no.: 527
- Conservation organization: Cultural Heritage, Handicrafts and Tourism Organization of Iran

The Hajj Agha Ali Mosque (Persian: مسجد حاج آقا علی) is a Shi'ite mosque located in the city of Kerman, in the province of Kerman, Iran. The mosque was completed in 1870 CE, during the Qajar era.

The mosque was added to the Iran National Heritage List on 21 March 1966, administered by the Cultural Heritage, Handicrafts and Tourism Organization of Iran.

== Gallery ==
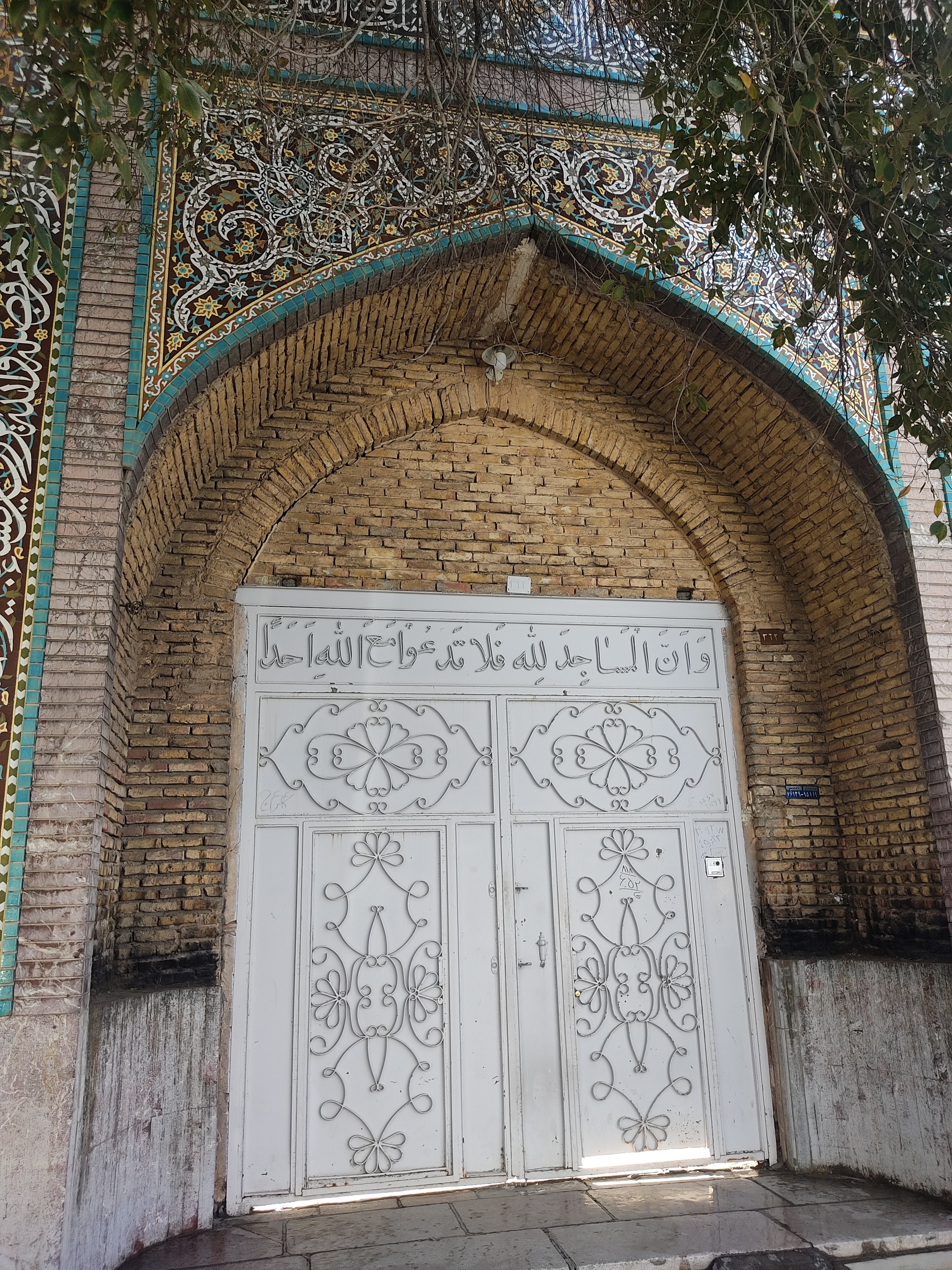

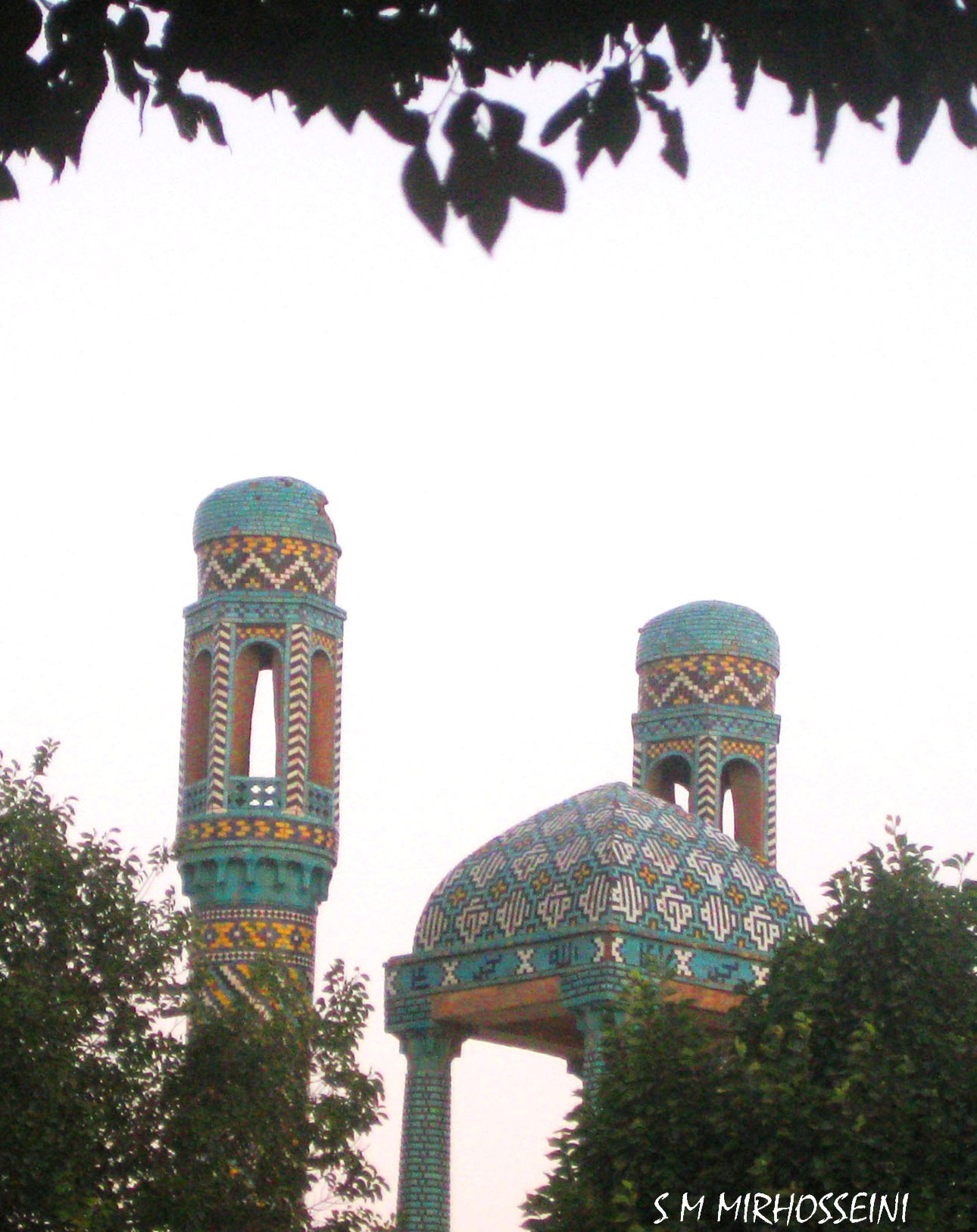

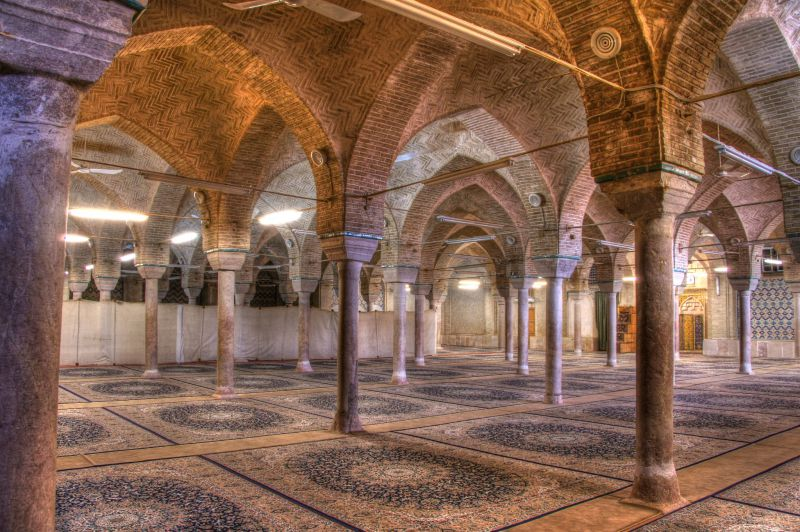

== See also ==
- Shia Islam in Iran
- List of mosques in Iran
