= Dash Aghlian Mosque =

Shi'ite mosque in Khoy, West Azerbaijan Province, Iran

- مسجد داش آغلیان
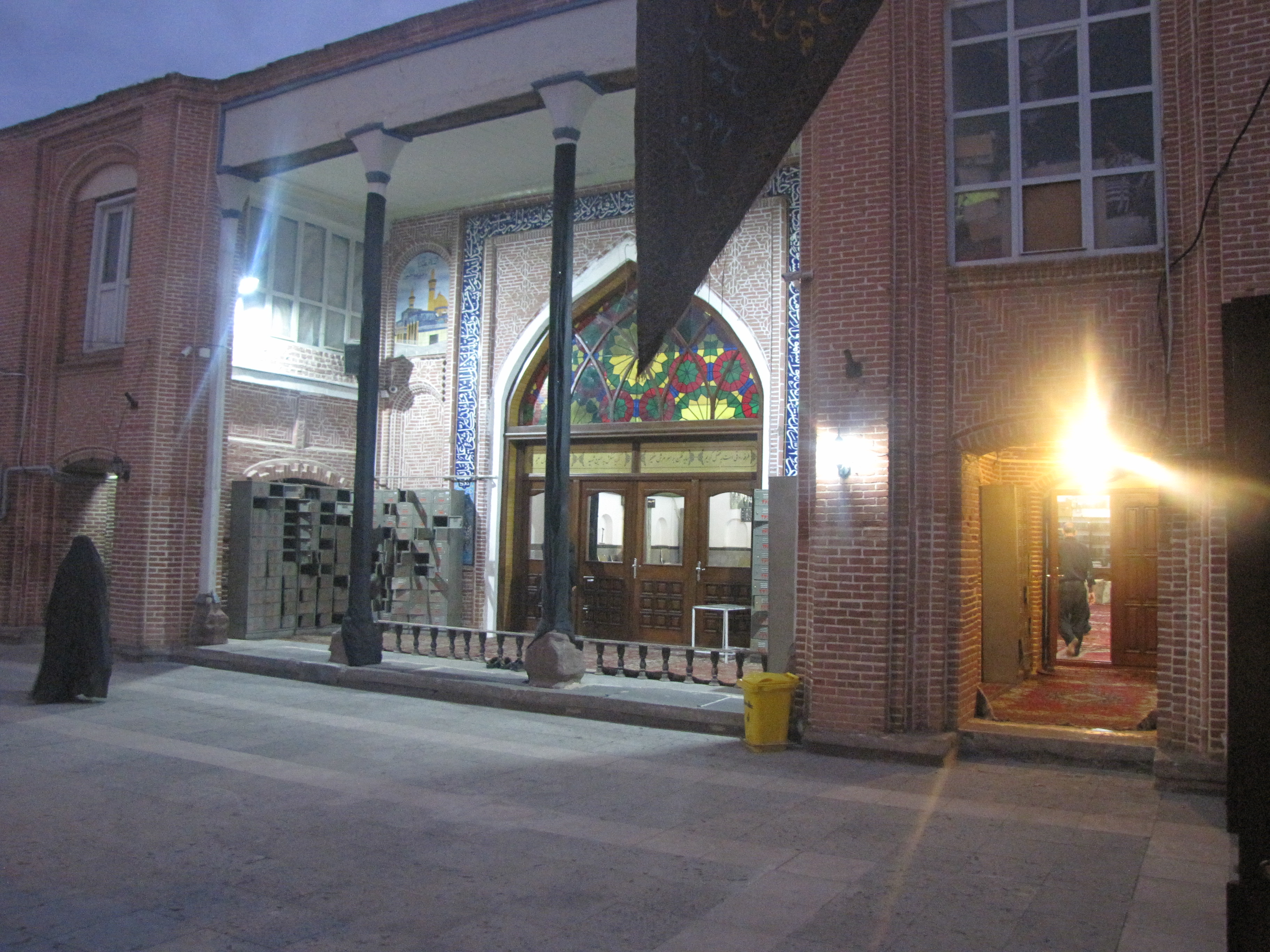
- The mosque at night

- Location of the mosque in Iran

Religion
- Affiliation: Shia Islam
- Ecclesiastical or organizational status: Mosque
- Status: Active

Location
- Location: Khoy, West Azerbaijan province
- Country: Iran
- Interactive map of Dash Aghlian Mosque
- Coordinates: 38.555042°N 44.964322°E

Architecture
- Type: Mosque architecture
- Completed: 19th century; Qajar era

Specifications
- Interior area: 400 m^{2} (4,300 sq ft)
- Materials: Stone; bricks; timber; mortar

Iran National Heritage List
- Official name: Dash Aghlian Mosque
- Type: Built
- Designated: 24 August 1999
- Reference no.: 2390
- Conservation organization: Cultural Heritage, Handicrafts and Tourism Organization of Iran

The Dash Aghlian Mosque (Persian: مسجد داش آغلیان; Arabic: مسجد داش آغليان) is a Shi'ite mosque located on Shahid Samadzadeh Street, in Khoy, in the province of West Azerbaijan, Iran. The mosque was completed in the 19th century, during the Qajar era.

The mosque was added to the Iran National Heritage List on 24 August 1999, administered by the Cultural Heritage, Handicrafts and Tourism Organization of Iran.

== See also ==
- Shia Islam in Iran
- List of mosques in Iran
