= Pamenar Mosque, Mehdishahr =

Mosque in Mehdishahr, Semnan province, Iran

Pamenar Mosque
- مسجد پامنار (مهدی‌شهر)

Religion
- Affiliation: Shia Islam
- Ecclesiastical or organizational status: Mosque
- Status: Active

Location
- Location: Mehdishahr, Semnan Province
- Country: Iran

Architecture
- Type: Mosque architecture
- Style: Sasanian
- Completed: Sasanian Empire
- Dome: One (maybe more)

The Pamenar Mosque (Persian: مسجد پامنار (مهدی‌شهر); Arabic: مسجد بامنار (مهدي شهر)) is a mosque in Mehdishahr, in the province of Semnan, Iran. The mosque was completed during the Sasanian era.

== See also ==
- Shia Islam in Iran
- List of mosques in Iran
