= List of mosques in Iran =

This is a list of mosques in Iran.

As of 2015, it was estimated that there were 47,291 Shi'ite mosques and 10,344 Sunni mosques in Iran.

== List of mosques ==
This list of mosques in Iran is sorted by province; and, where applicable, by major settlement.

=== Ardabil ===
- Jameh Mosque of Germi
- Jameh Mosque of Namin
- Jome Mosque (former)

=== East Azerbaijan ===
In Tabirz

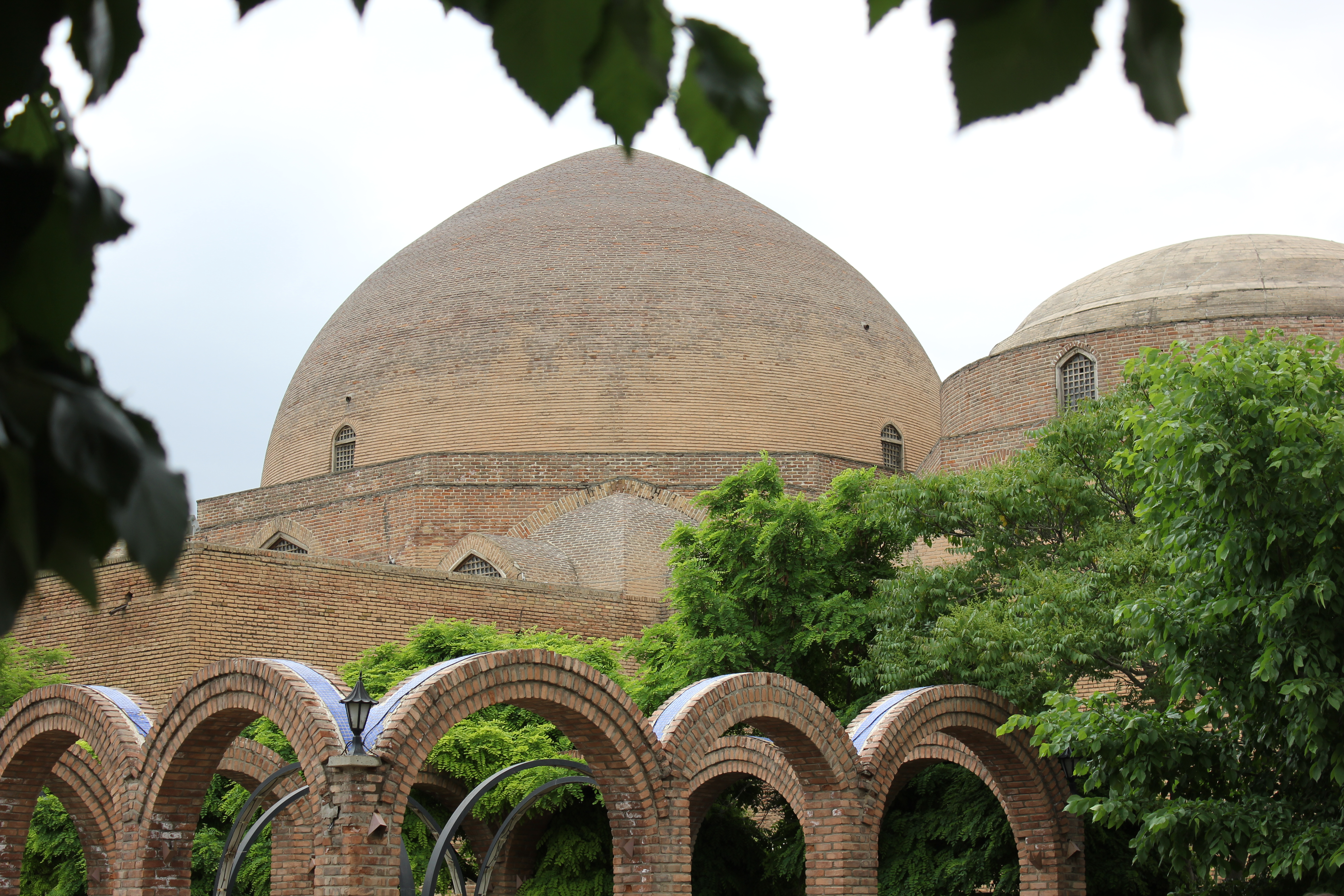
Former Blue Mosque, Tabriz

- Arg of Tabriz (former)
- Blue Mosque, Tabriz (former)
- Hajj Safar Ali Mosque
- Imamzadeh Hamzah, Tabriz
- Imamzadeh Sayyid Muhammad Kojajani
- Jameh Mosque of Tabriz
- Mausoleum of Awn ibn Ali
- Mosque of Master and Student
- Saheb-ol-Amr Mosque
- Shohada Mosque

Elsewhere

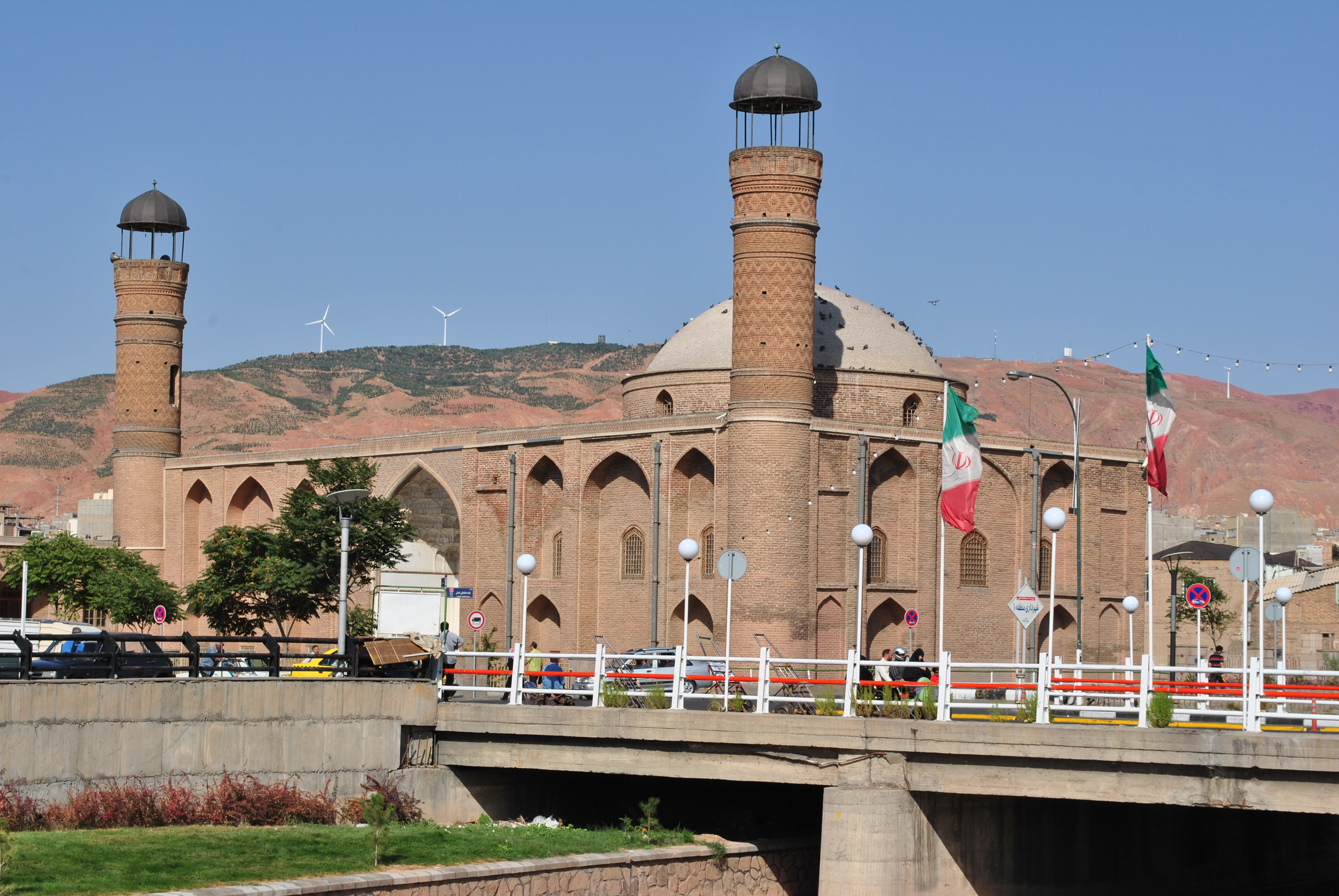
Saheb-ol-Amr Mosque

- Jameh Mosque of Ahar
- Jameh Mosque of Marand
- Jameh Mosque of Mehrabad
- Jameh Mosque of Sarab
- Mirpanj Mosque
- Stone Tark Mosque

=== Fars ===
In Shiraz

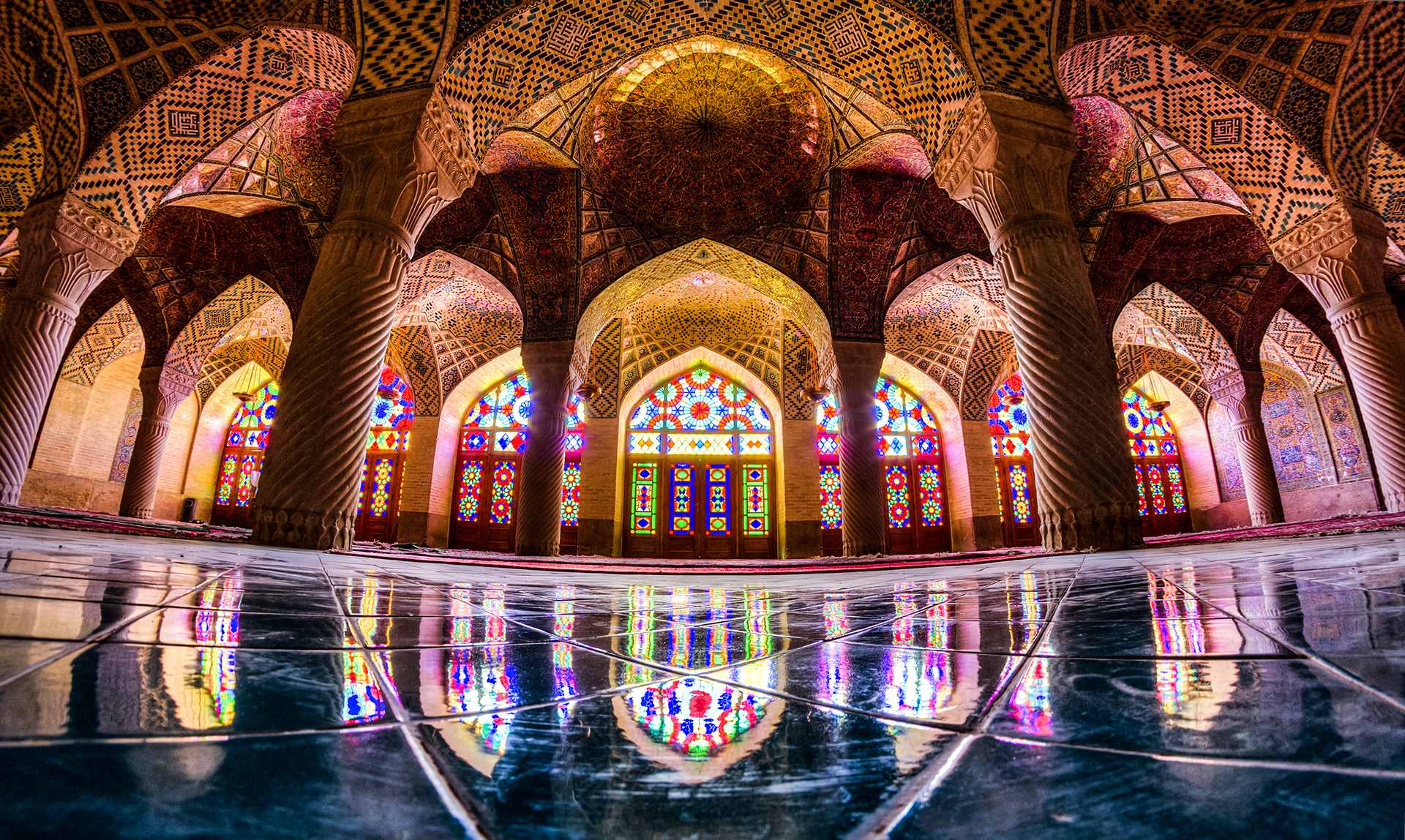
Nasir-ol-molk Mosque

- Jameh Mosque of Atigh
- Mohammad Rasul-Allah Mosque
- Nasir-ol-Molk Mosque
- Shah Cheragh
- Tomb of Ali ibn Hamzah, Shiraz
- Tomb of Seyed Alaeddin Husayn
- Vakil Mosque

Elsewhere

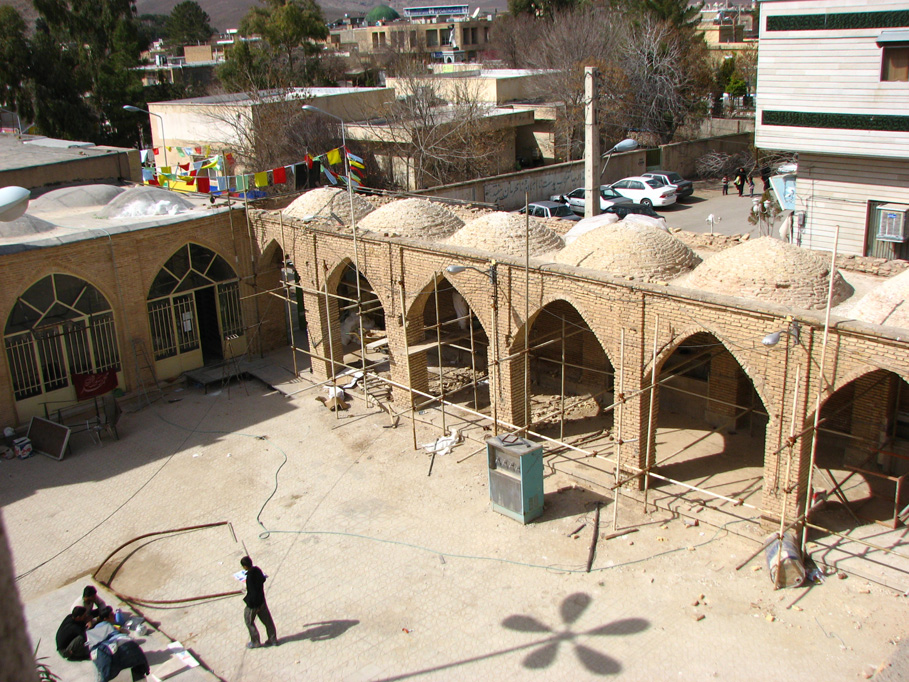
Jameh Mosque of Arsanjan

- Jameh Mosque of Arsanjan
- Jameh Mosque of Darab
- Jameh Mosque of Jahrom
- Jameh Mosque of Kabir Neyriz
- Jameh Mosque of Lar

=== Gilan ===
- Espi Mazget (former)
- Hajj Samad Khan Mosque
- Chahar Padshahan

=== Golestan ===
- Jameh Mosque of Gorgan

=== Hamadan ===
- Jameh Mosque of Sarabi

=== Hormozgan ===
- Jameh Mosque of Bastak (former)
- Jameh Mosque of Bandar Abbas
- Jameh Mosque of Qiblah
- Jameh Mosque of Qeshm
- Malek bin Abbas Mosque

=== Isfahan ===
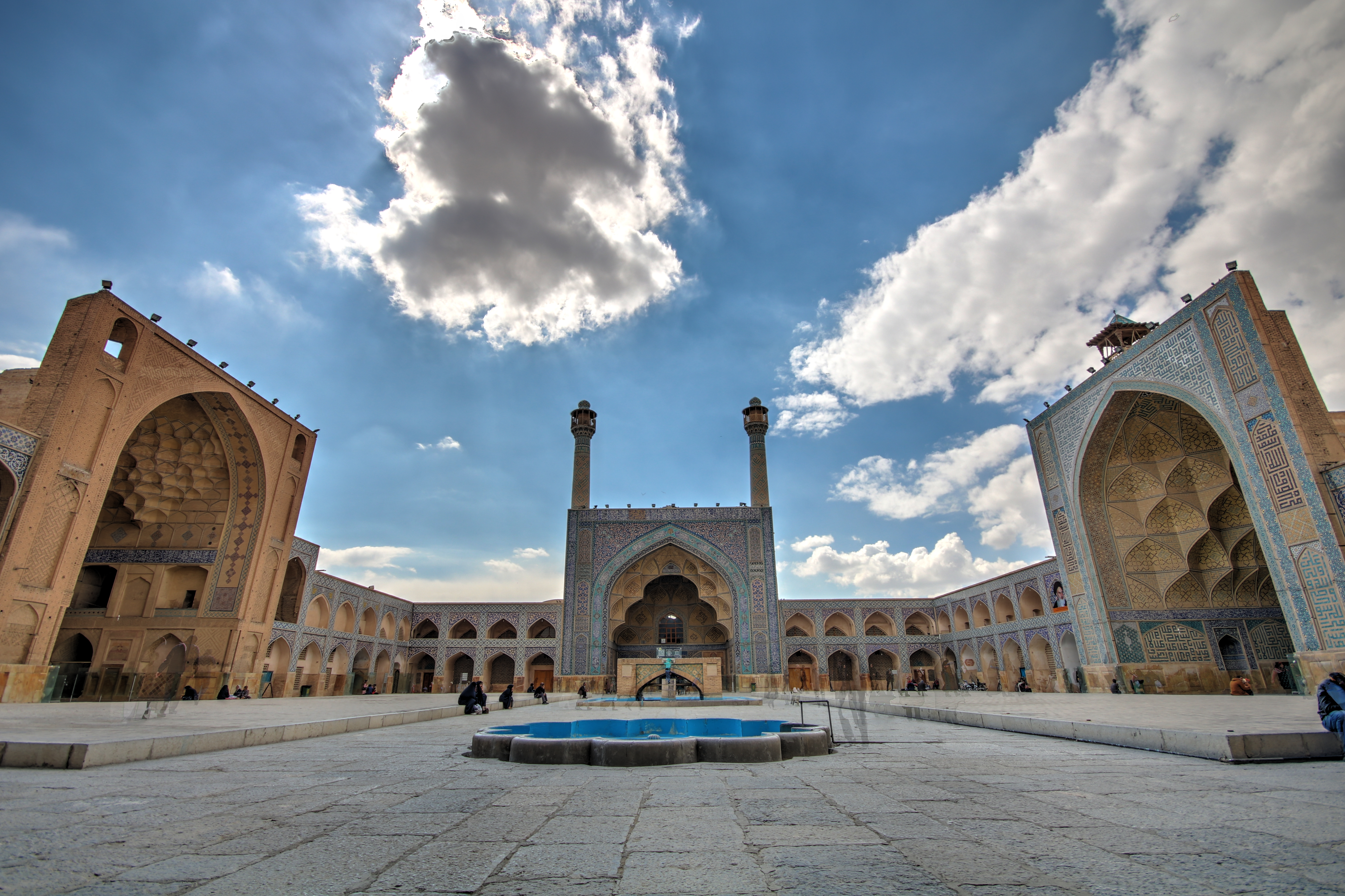
Jameh Mosque of Isfahan

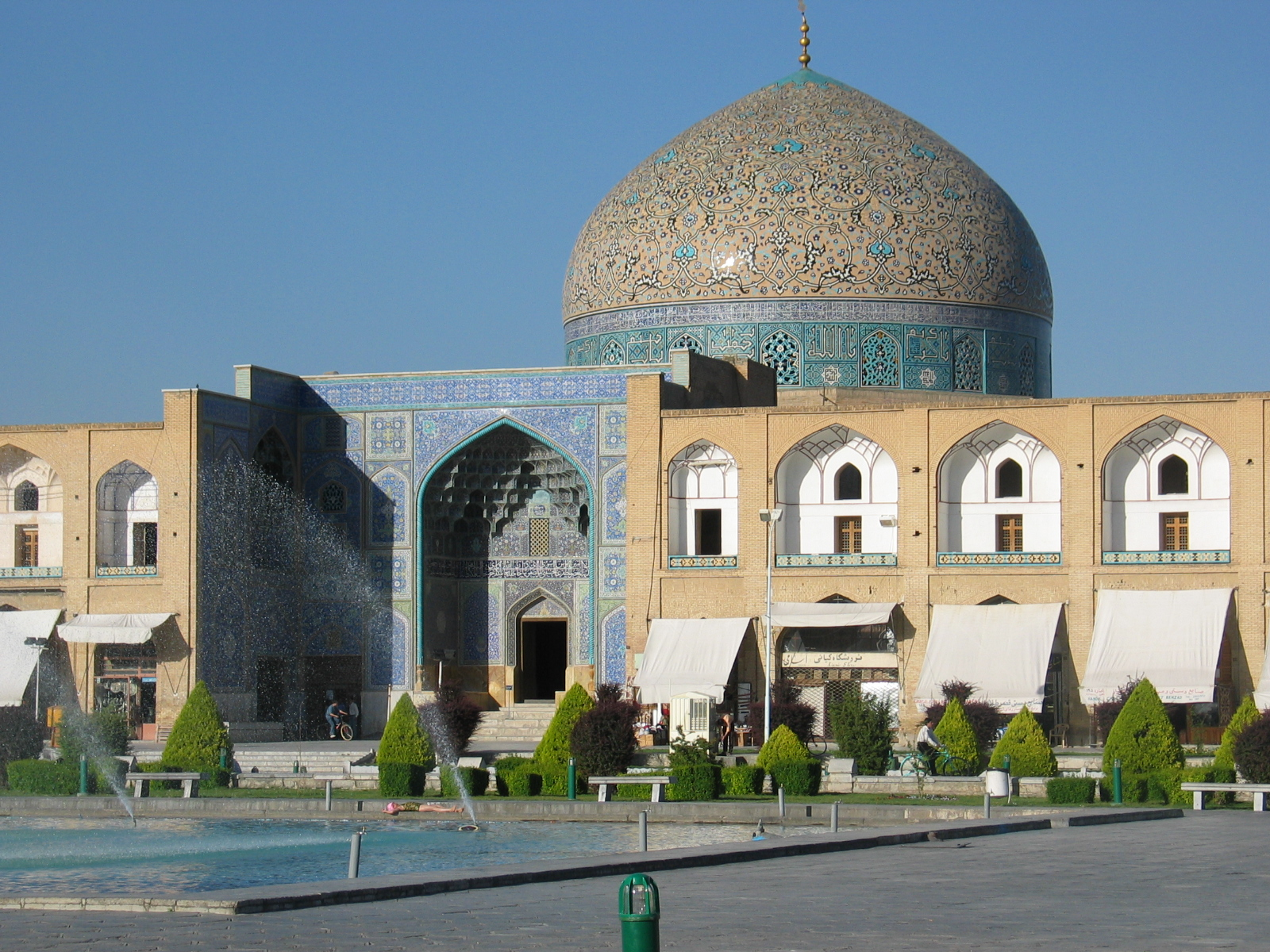
Sheikh Lotfollah Mosque

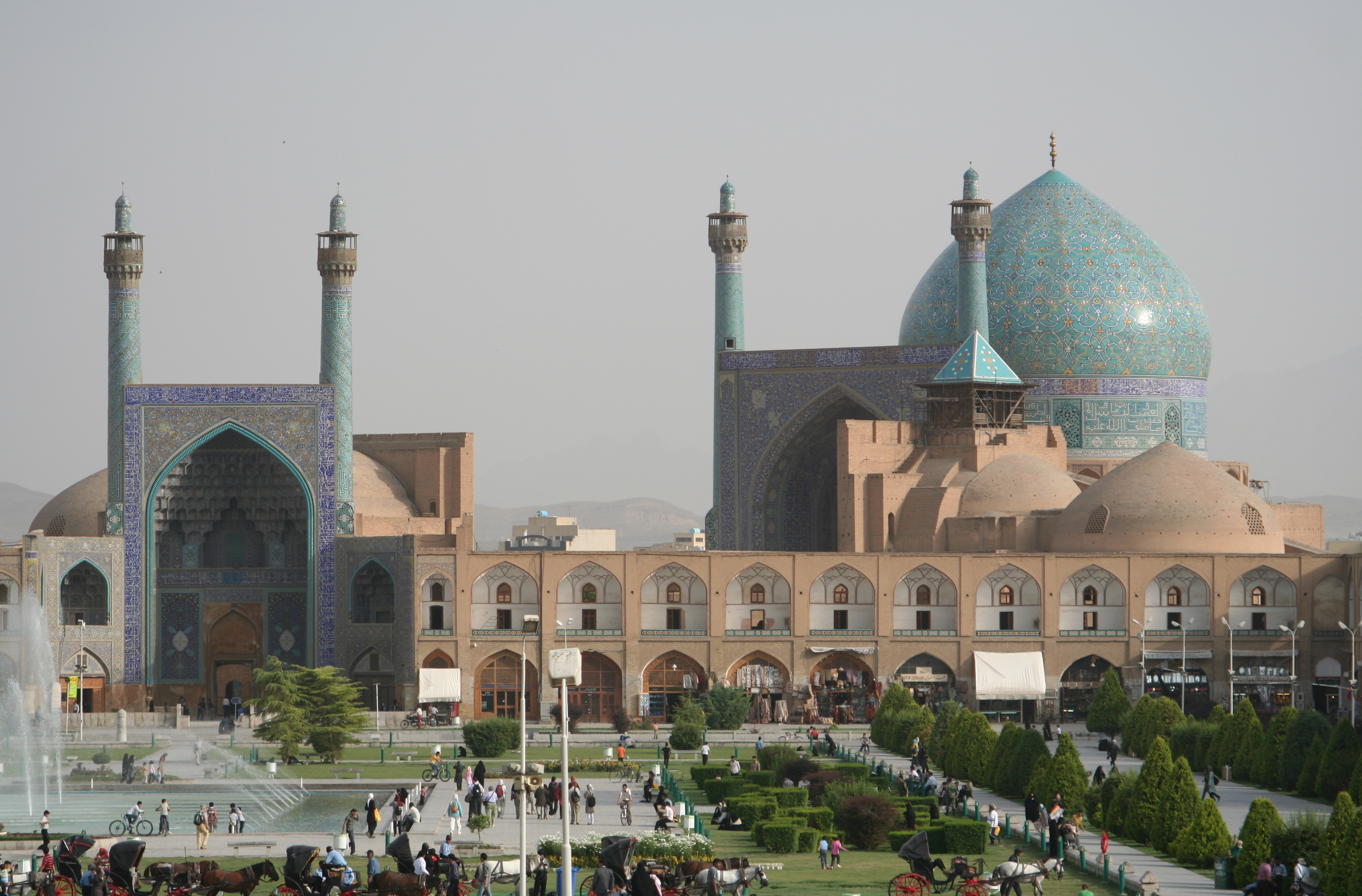
Shah Mosque (Isfahan)

In Esfahan

- Agha Mirza Muhammad Baqir Chahar Suqi Mosque
- Agha Nour Mosque
- Ali Gholi Agha Mosque
- Darb-e Imam
- Darvazeh No Mosque
- Dashti Mosque
- Gar mosque and minaret
- Grand Mosalla of Isfahan
- Hafshuye Mosque
- Hakim Mosque, Isfahan
- Ilchi Mosque
- Jameh Mosque of Isfahan
- Jarchi Mosque
- Lonban Mosque
- Maghsoudbeyk Mosque
- Mesri Mosque
- Mohammad Jafar Abadei Mosque
- Monar Jonban
- Rahim Khan Mosque
- Roknolmolk Mosque
- Safa Mosque
- Saru Taqi Mosque
- Seyyed Mosque (Isfahan)
- Shah Mosque (Isfahan)
- Sheikh Lotfollah Mosque

Elsewhere

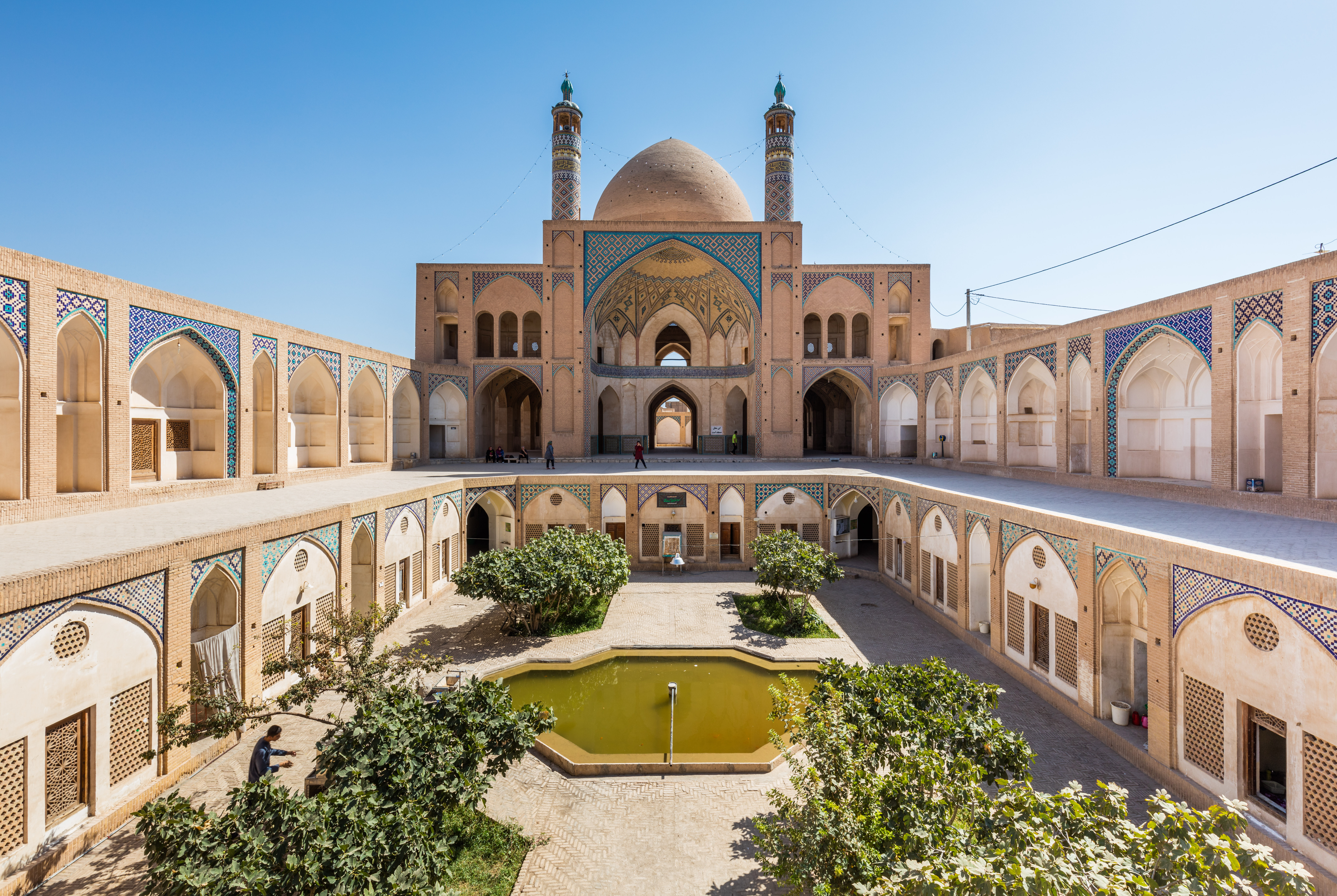
Agha Bozorg Mosque

- Agha Bozorg Mosque
- Barsian mosque and minaret
- Jameh Mosque of Ardestan
- Jameh Mosque of Ashtarjan
- Jameh Mosque of Golpayegan
- Jameh Mosque of Kashan
- Jameh Mosque of Khansar
- Jameh Mosque of Khozan
- Jameh Mosque of Meymeh
- Jameh Mosque of Nain
- Jameh Mosque of Natanz
- Jameh Mosque of Nushabad
- Jameh Mosque of Zavareh
- Kaj Mosque
- Meydan Mosque, Kashan
- Tabriziha Mosque

=== Kerman ===
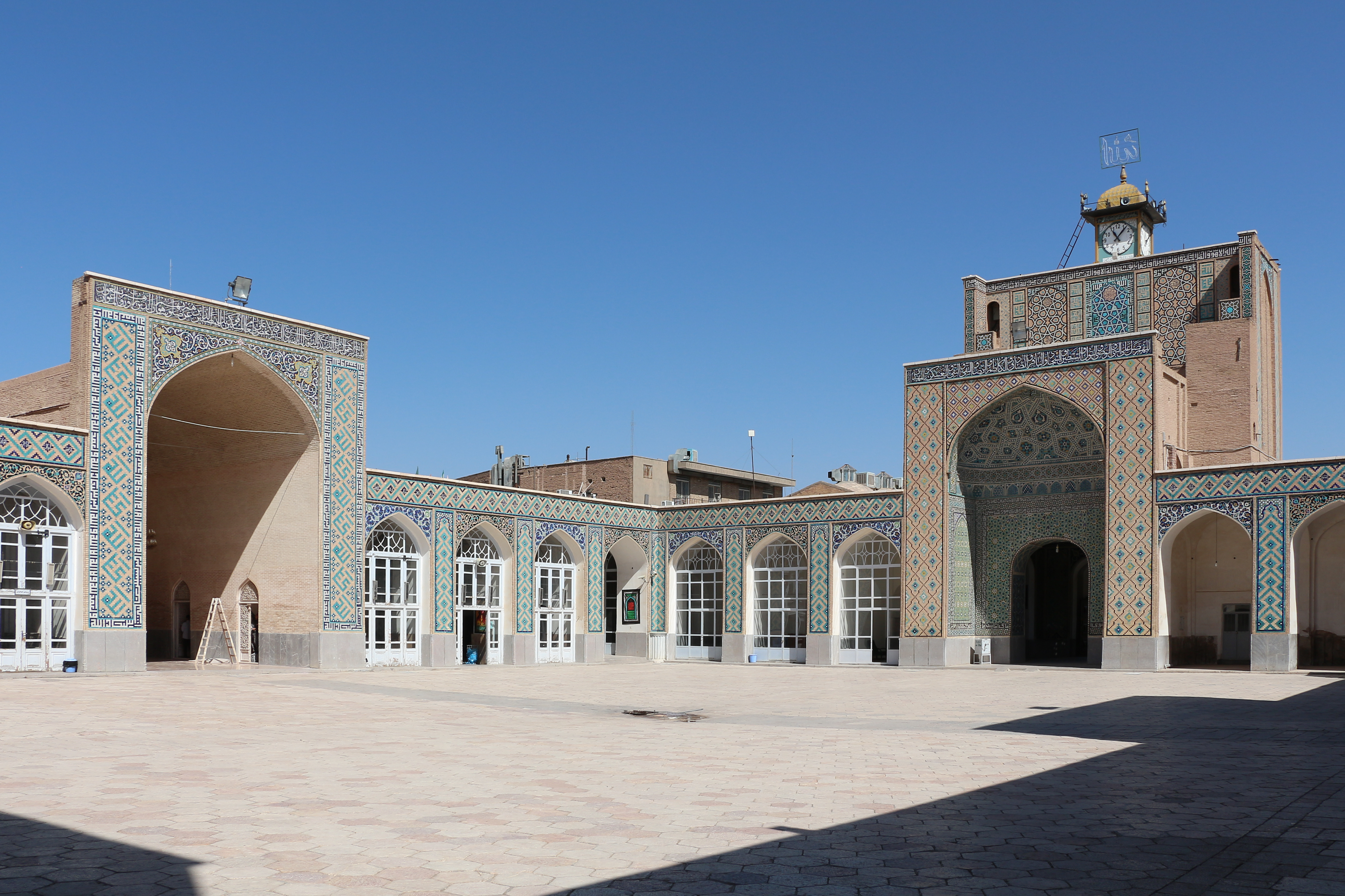
Jameh Mosque of Kerman

- Gonbad-e Sabz Mosque
- Hajj Agha Ali Mosque
- Jameh Mosque of Kerman
- Malek Mosque
- Pamenar Mosque, Kerman

=== Kermanshah ===
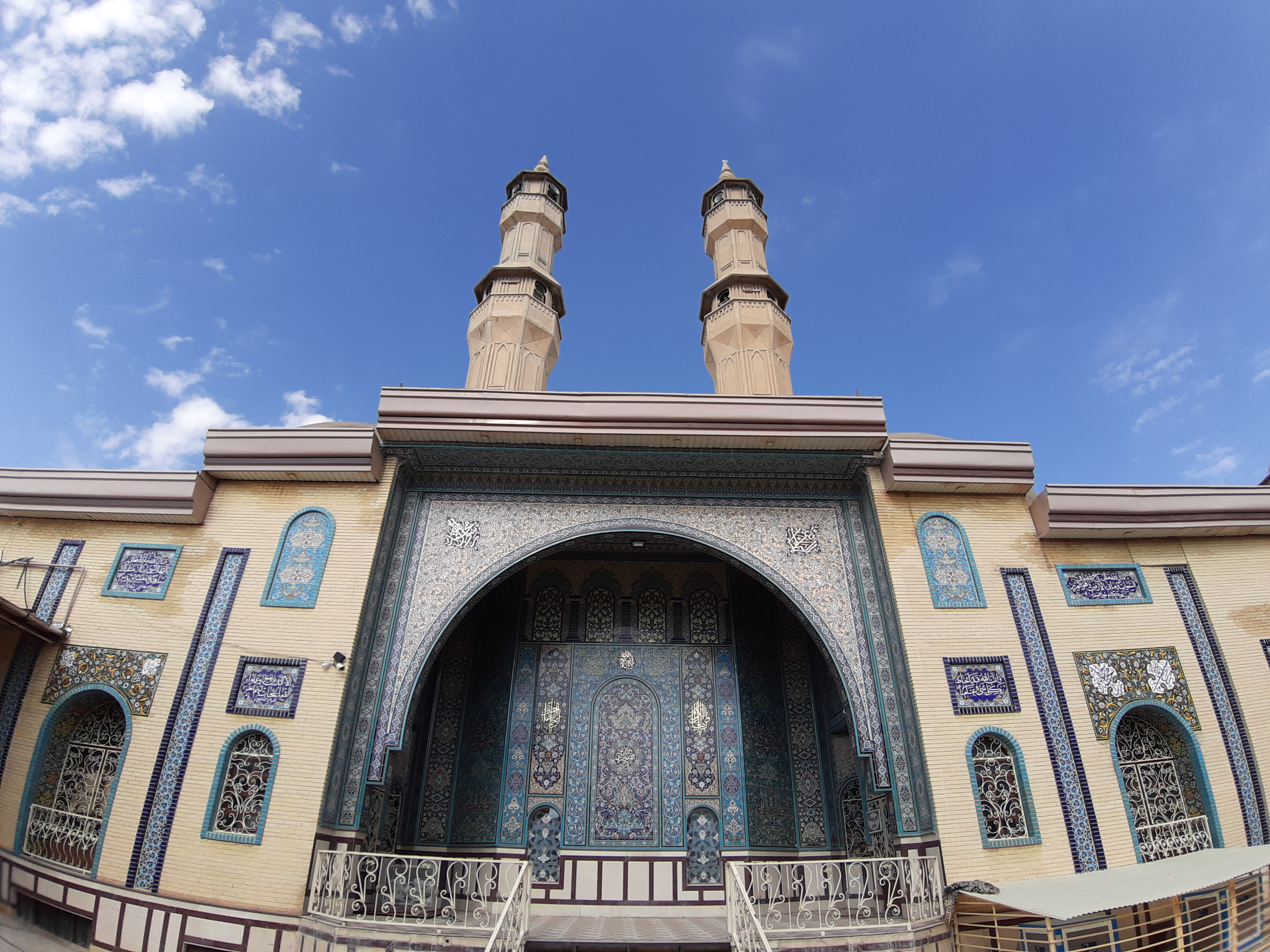
Jameh Mosque of Shafei

- Abdullah ibn Umar Mosque
- Emad od-Dowleh Mosque
- Hajj Shahbazkhan Mosque
- Jameh Mosque of Kermanshah
- Jameh Mosque of Shafei

=== Khuzestan ===
- Jameh Mosque of Dezful
- Jameh Mosque of Khorramshahr
- Jameh Mosque of Shushtar
- Rangooniha Mosque (former)

=== Kurdistan ===
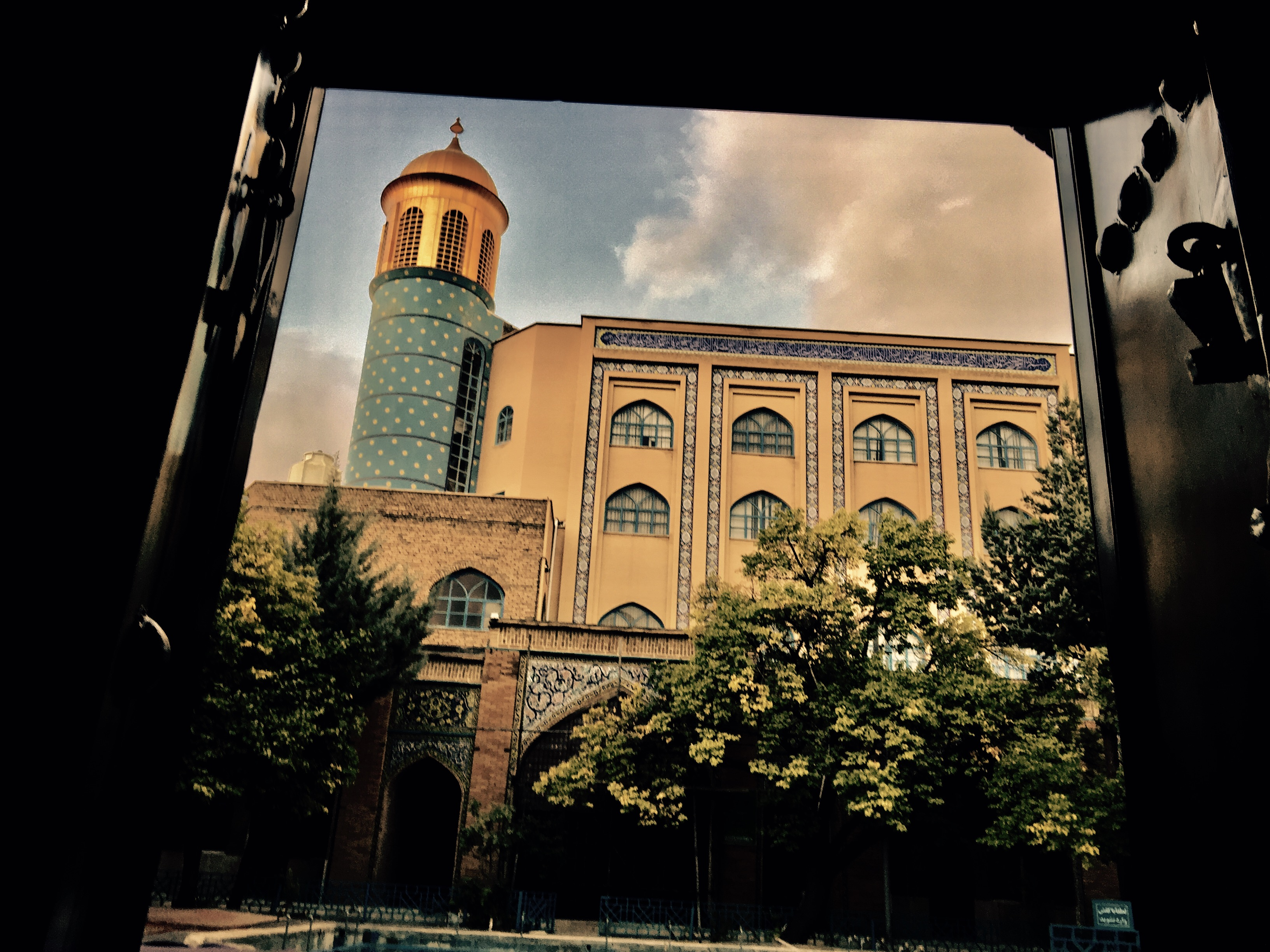
Dar ul-Ihsan Mosque

- Dar ul-Ihsan Mosque
- Domenareh Mosque
- Hajar Khatoon Mosque

=== Lorestan ===
- Imamzadeh Ja'far, Borujerd
- Jameh Mosque of Borujerd
- Soltani Mosque of Borujerd

=== Markazi ===
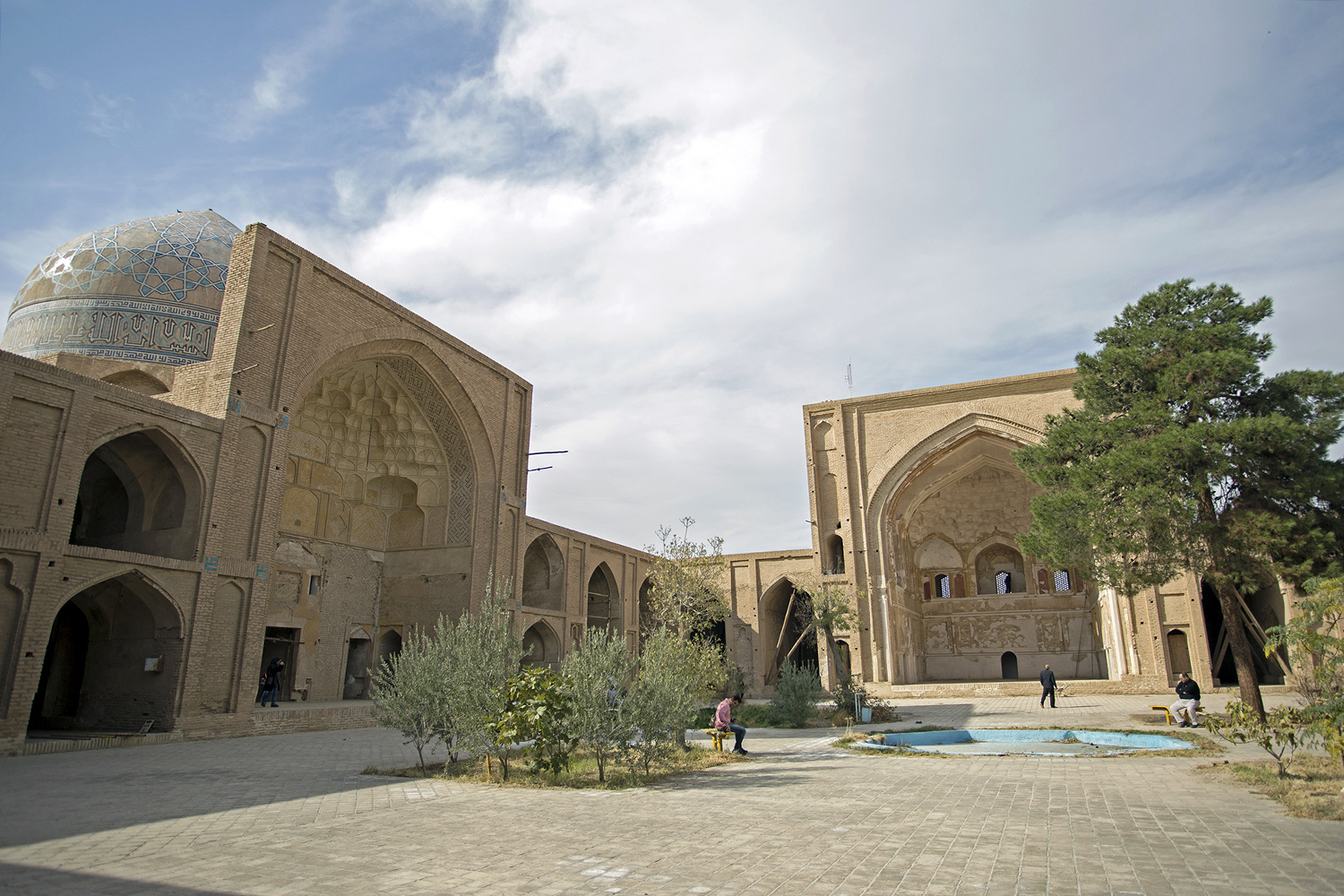
Jameh Mosque of Saveh

- Agha Zia ol Din Mosque
- Jameh Mosque of Arak
- Jameh Mosque of Saveh

=== Mazandaran ===
- Farahabad Mosque
- Jameh Mosque of Amol
- Jameh Mosque of Babol
- Jameh Mosque of Sari

=== Qazvin ===
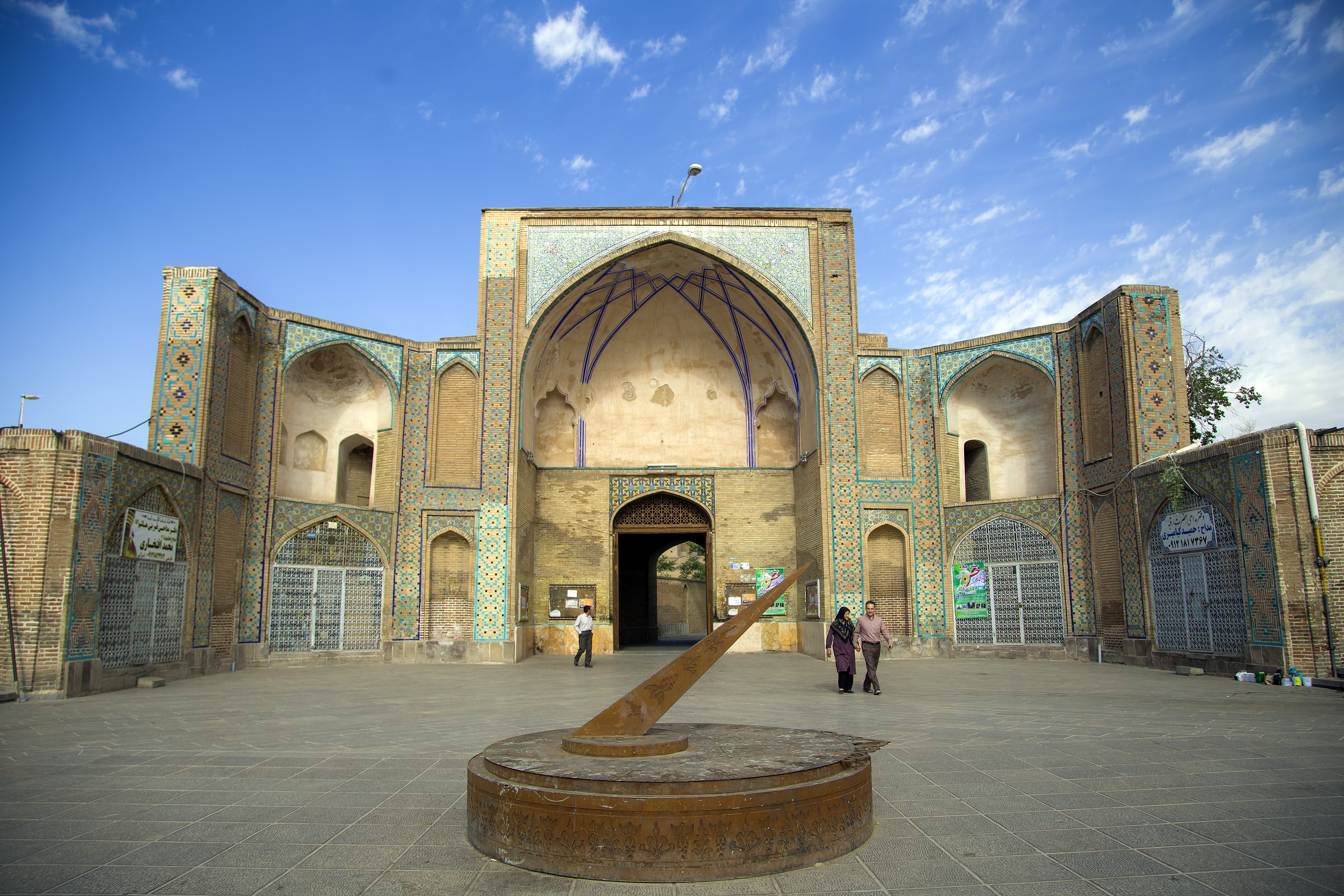
Jameh Mosque of Qazvin

- Al-Nabi Mosque, Qazvin
- Heidarieh Mosque, Qazvin (former)
- Jameh Mosque of Qazvin

=== Qom ===
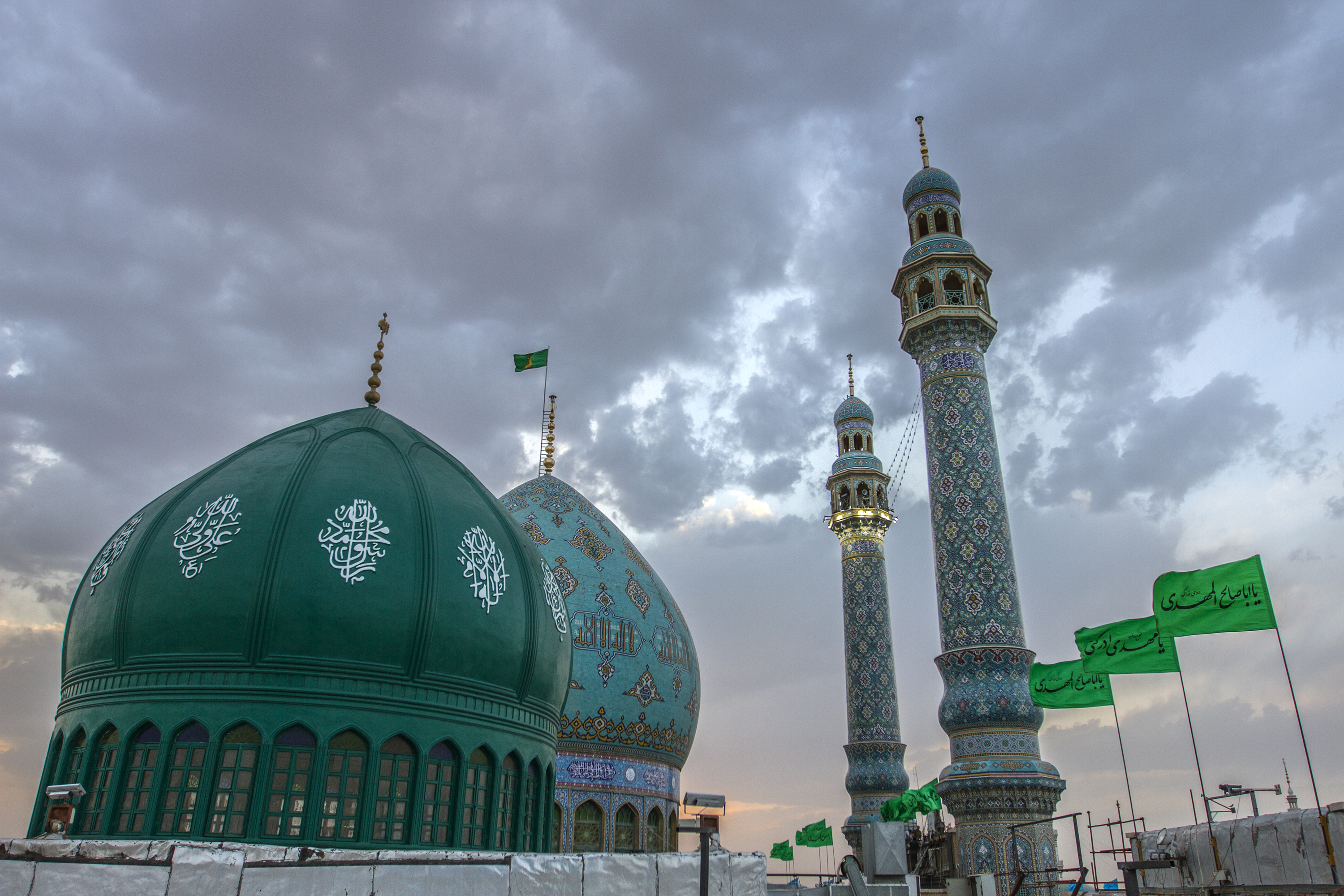
Jamkaran Mosque

- Azam Mosque of Qom
- Chehel Akhtaran Mosque
- Imam Hasan al-Askari Mosque
- Jameh Mosque of Pachian
- Jameh Mosque of Qom
- Jamkaran Mosque

=== Razavi Khorasan ===
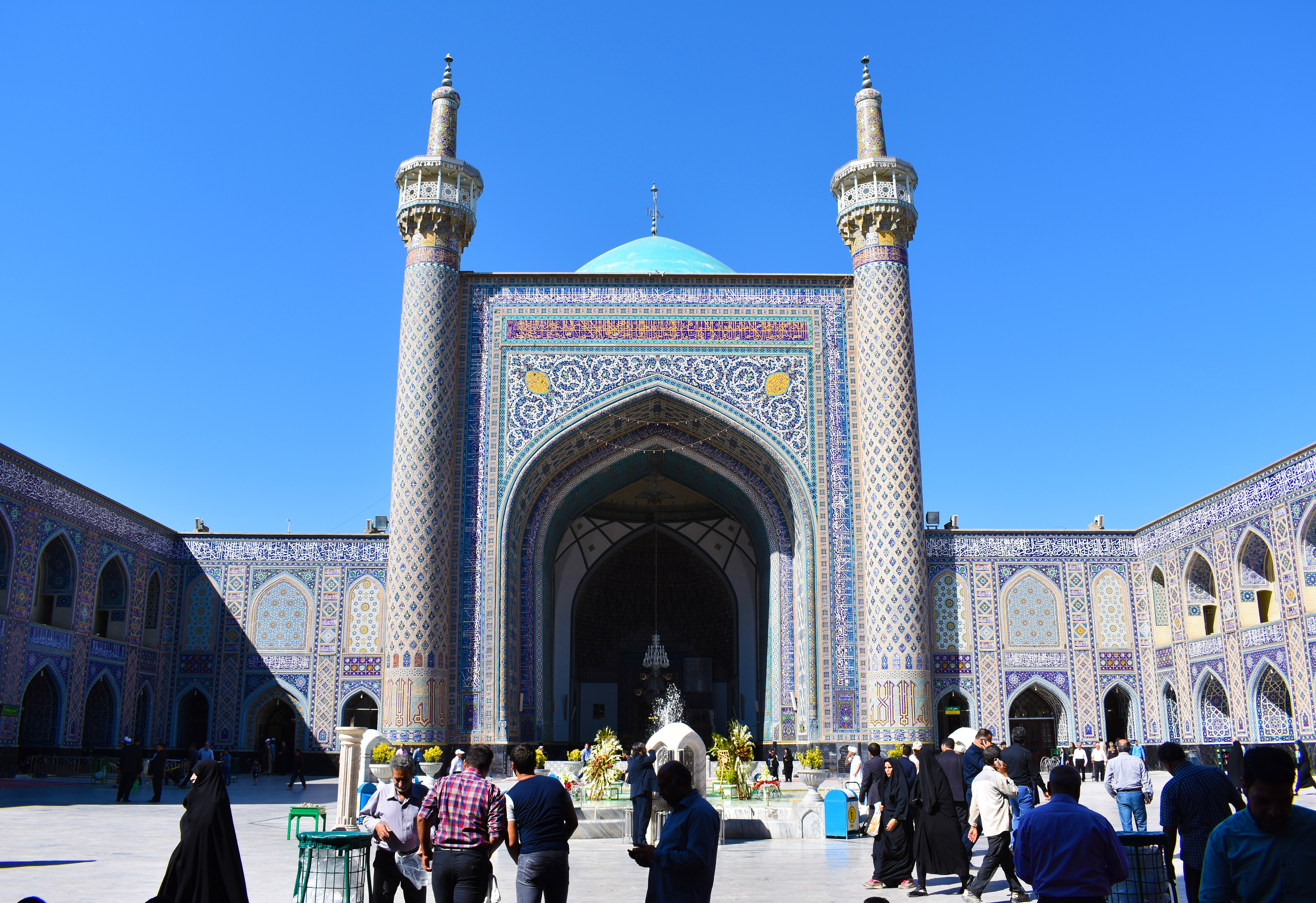
Goharshad Mosque

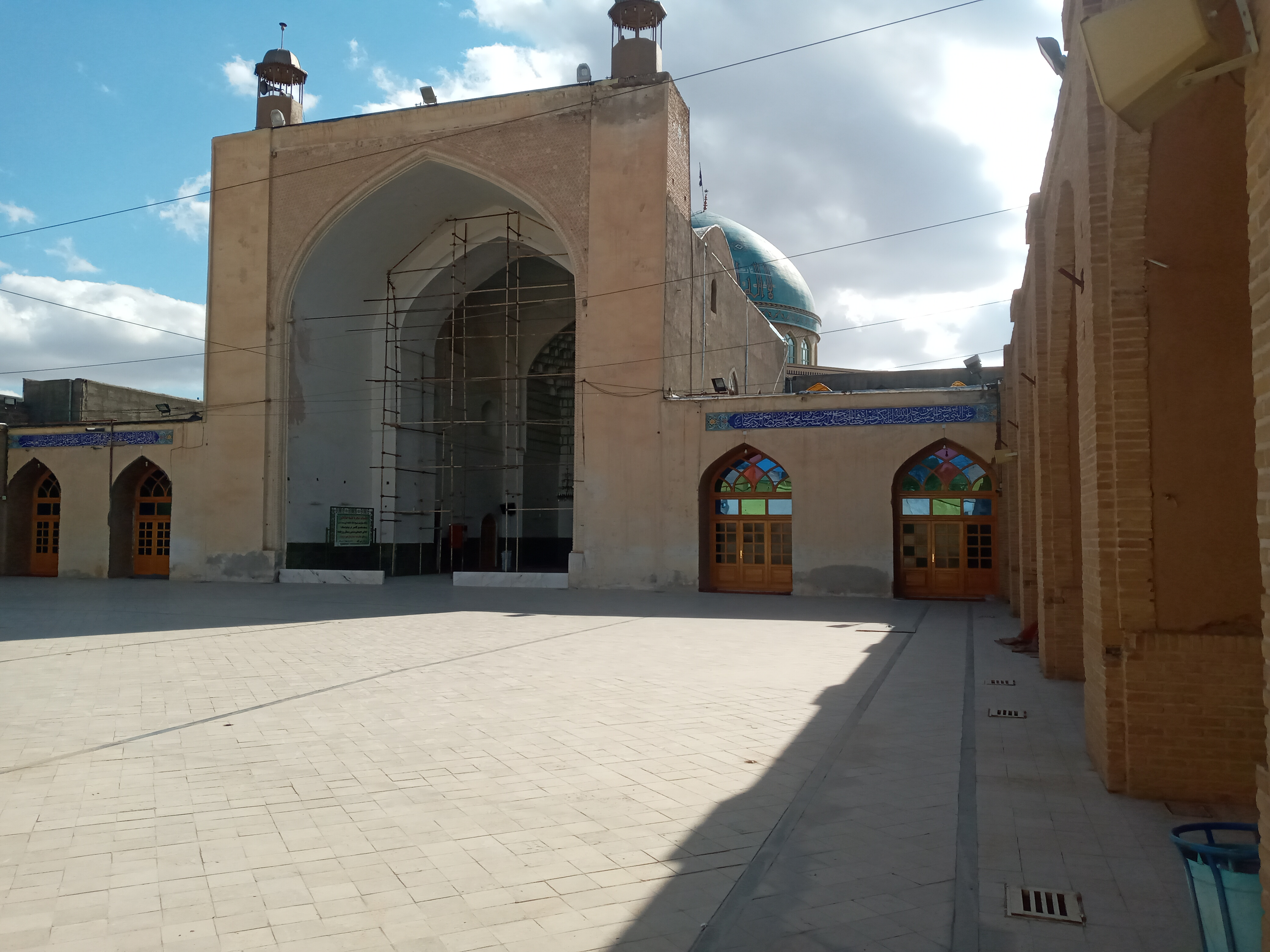
Jameh Mosque of Kashmar

- Gonbad Kabud Mosque
- Goharshad Mosque
- Haji Jalal Mosque
- Howz-e Ma'jardar Mosque
- Jameh Mosque of Gonabad
- Jameh Mosque of Kashmar
- Jameh Mosque of Marandiz
- Jameh Mosque of Nishapur
- Jameh Mosque of Radkan
- Jameh Mosque of Sabzevar
- Khosrow Shir Mosque (former)
- Pamenar Mosque, Sabzevar
- Qadamgah Mosque
- Shah Mosque (Mashhad)
- Sheikh Fayz Mosque (former)
- Sunni Mosque of Lotfabad

=== Semnan ===
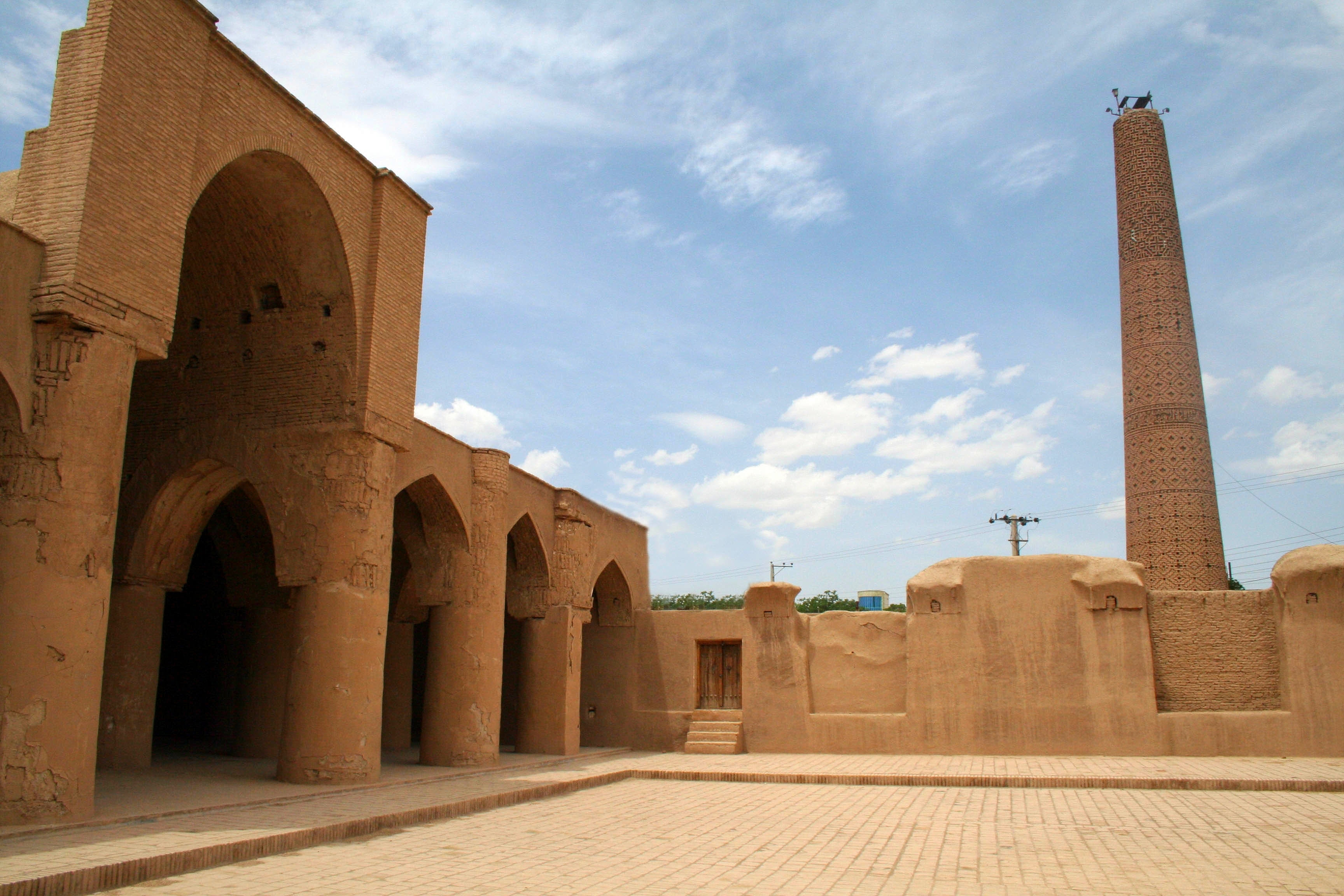
Tarikhaneh

- Imam Mosque, Semnan
- Jameh Mosque of Aradan
- Jameh Mosque of Damghan
- Jameh Mosque of Forumad
- Jameh Mosque of Semnan
- Jameh Mosque of Shahrud
- Pamenar Mosque, Mehdishahr
- Sheikh Bastami Mosque
- Tarikhaneh

=== Sistan and Baluchestan ===
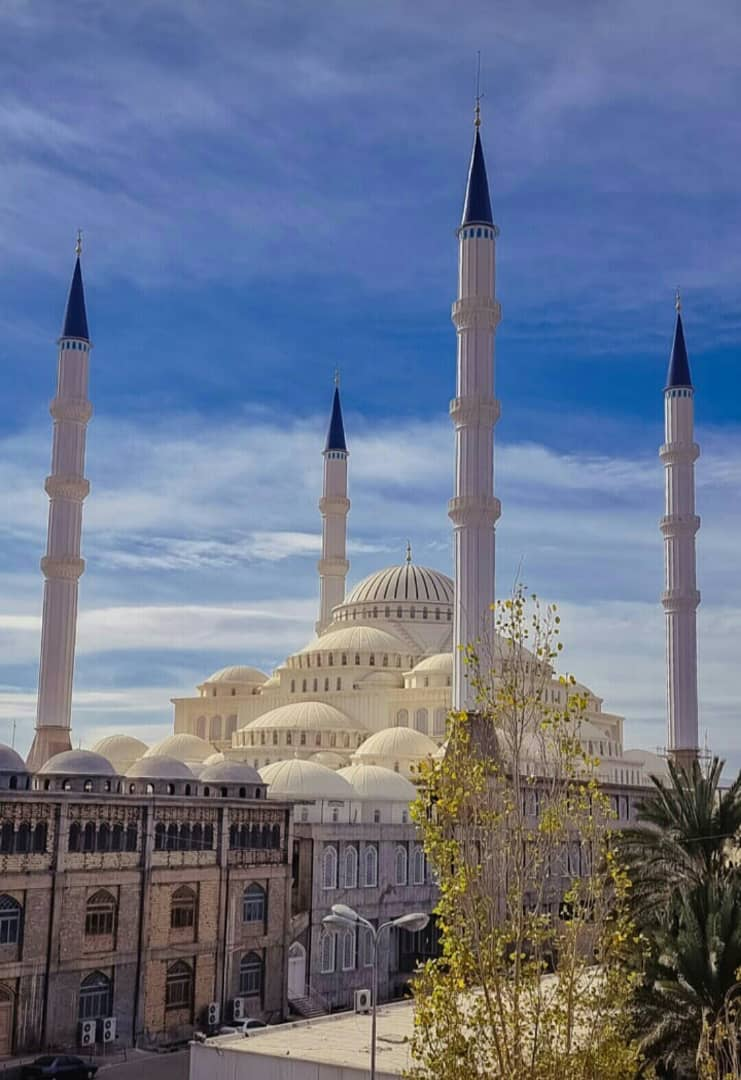
Jameh Mosque of Makki

- Jameh Mosque of Makki

=== South Khorasan ===
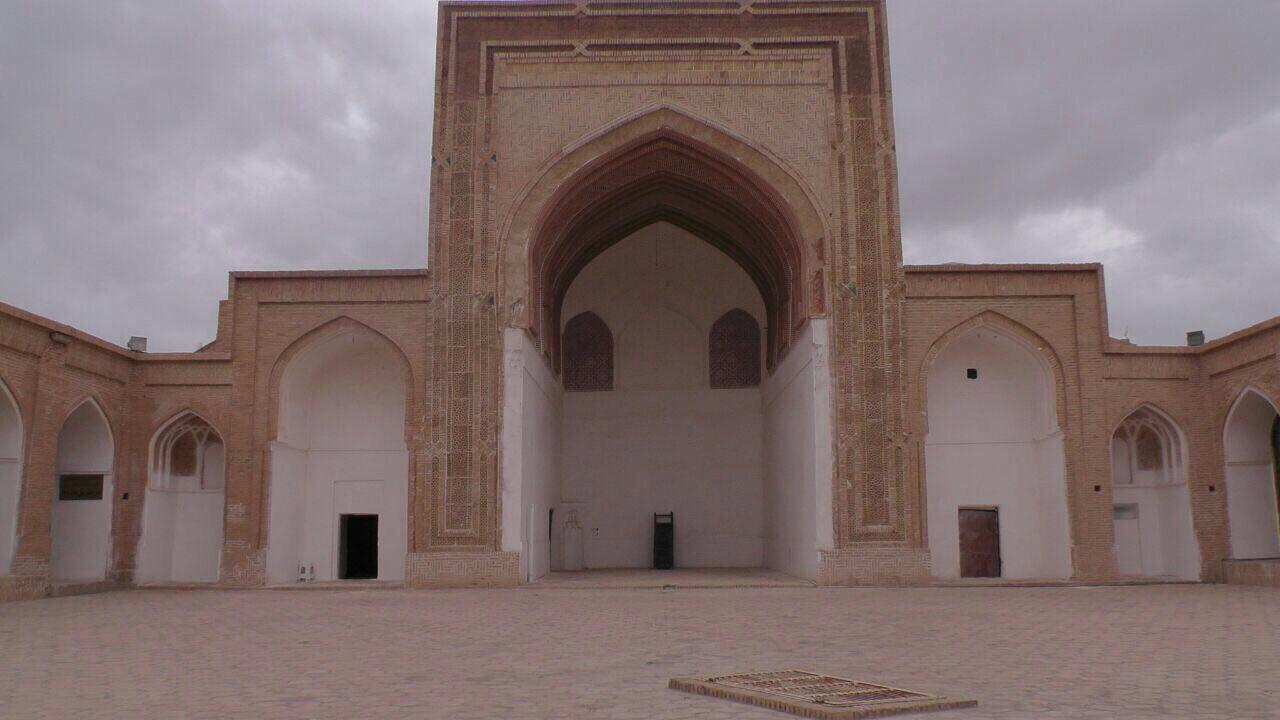
Jameh Mosque of Ferdows

- Jameh Mosque of Fathabad
- Jameh Mosque of Ferdows
- Jameh Mosque of Raqqeh
- Mahvid Mosque

=== Tehran ===
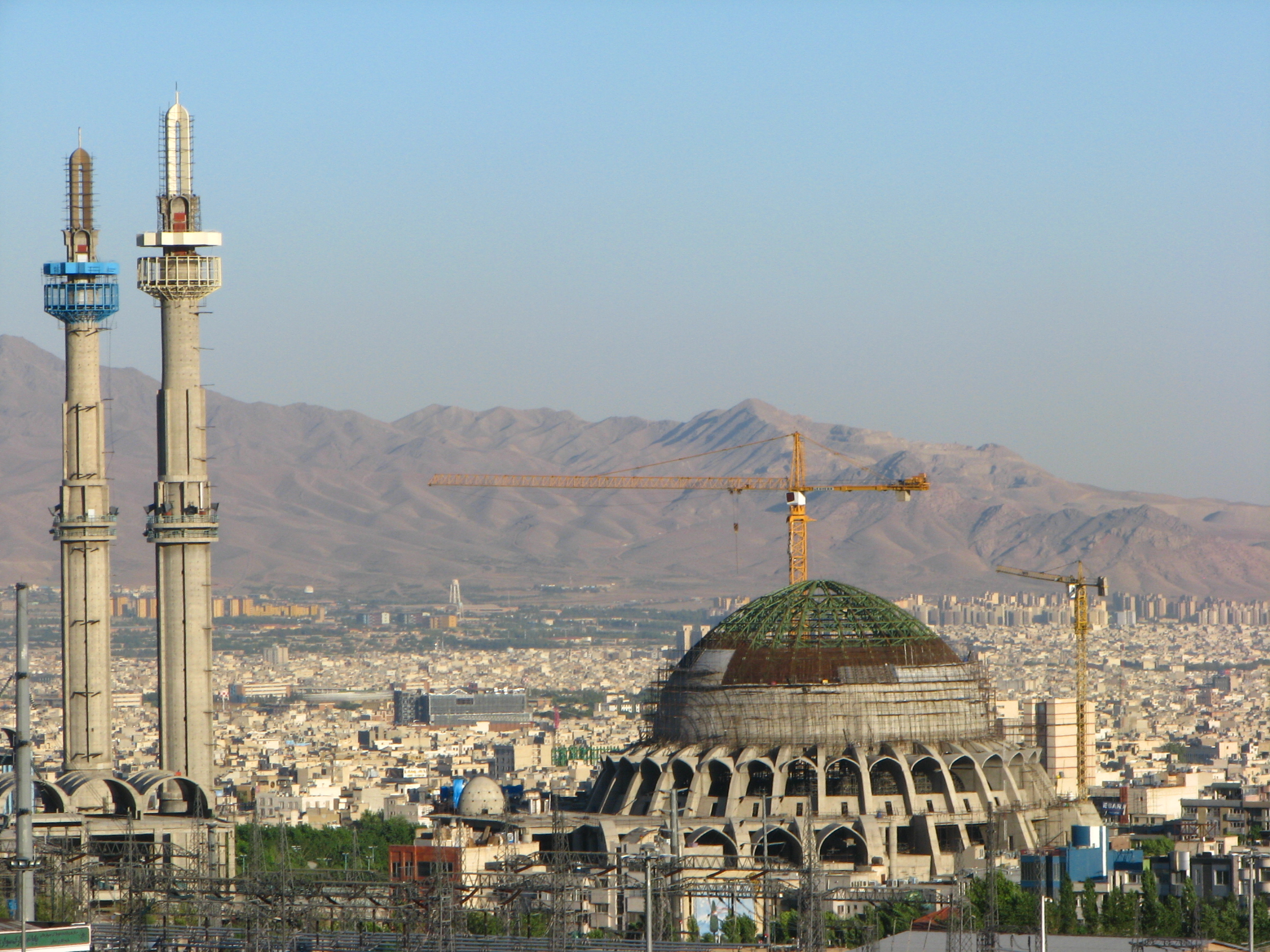
Grand Mosalla of Tehran, under construction

In Tehran

- Fakhr-ol-dowleh Mosque
- Grand Mosalla of Tehran (In active use; under construction)
- Hedayat Mosque
- Jameh Mosque of Tehran
- Lorzadeh Mosque
- Mirza Mousa Mosque
- Qoba Mosque
- Sepahsalar Mosque
- Shah Mosque (Tehran)
- Vali-e-Asr Mosque (Officially closed for worship)

Elsewhere

- Jameh Mosque of Damavand
- Jameh Mosque of Varamin

=== West Azerbaijan ===
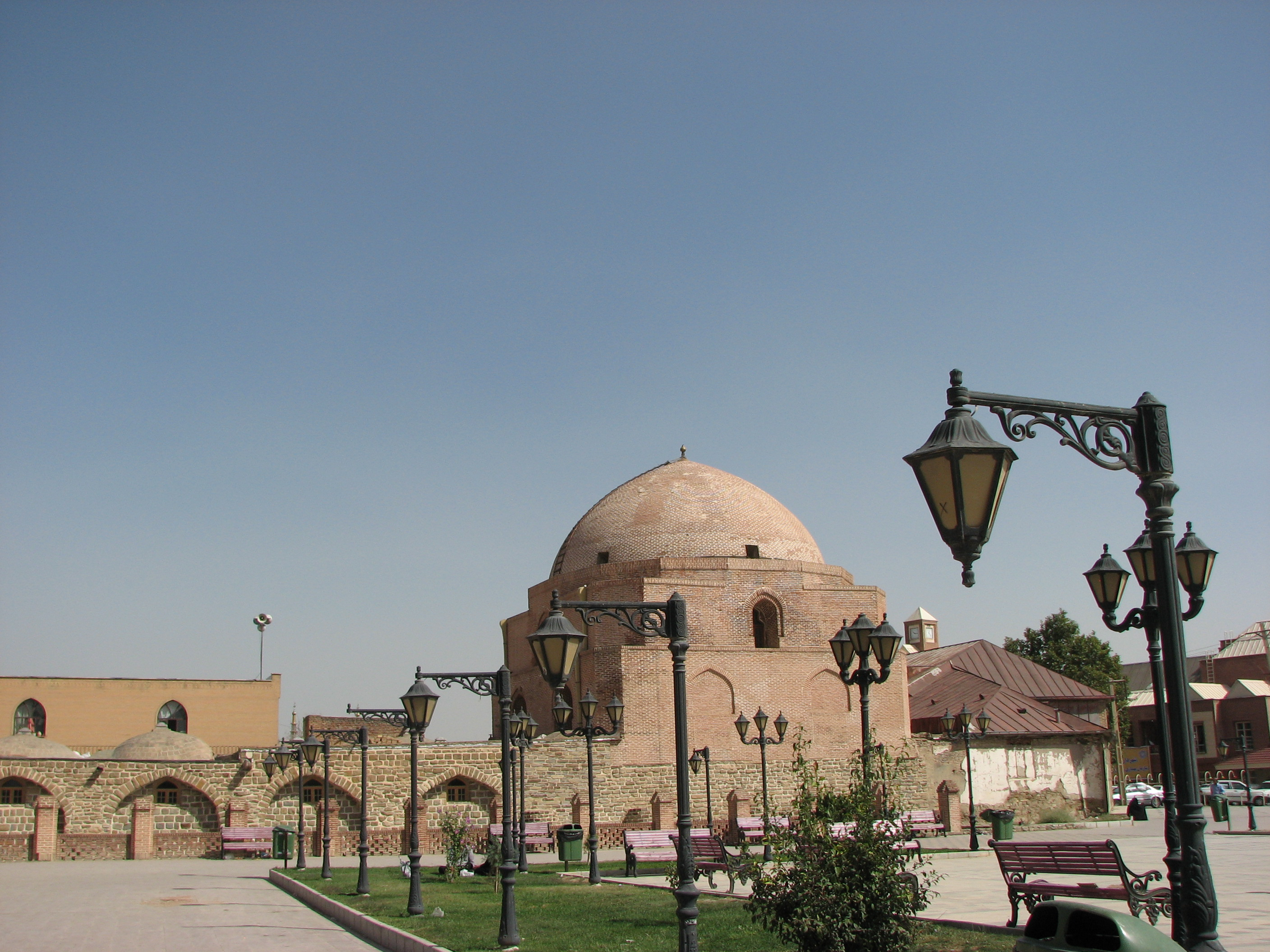
Jameh Mosque of Urmia

- Dash Aghlian Mosque
- Hojjatieh Mosque
- Jameh Mosque of Takab
- Jameh Mosque of Urmia
- Menareh Mosque
- Sardar Mosque

=== Yazd ===
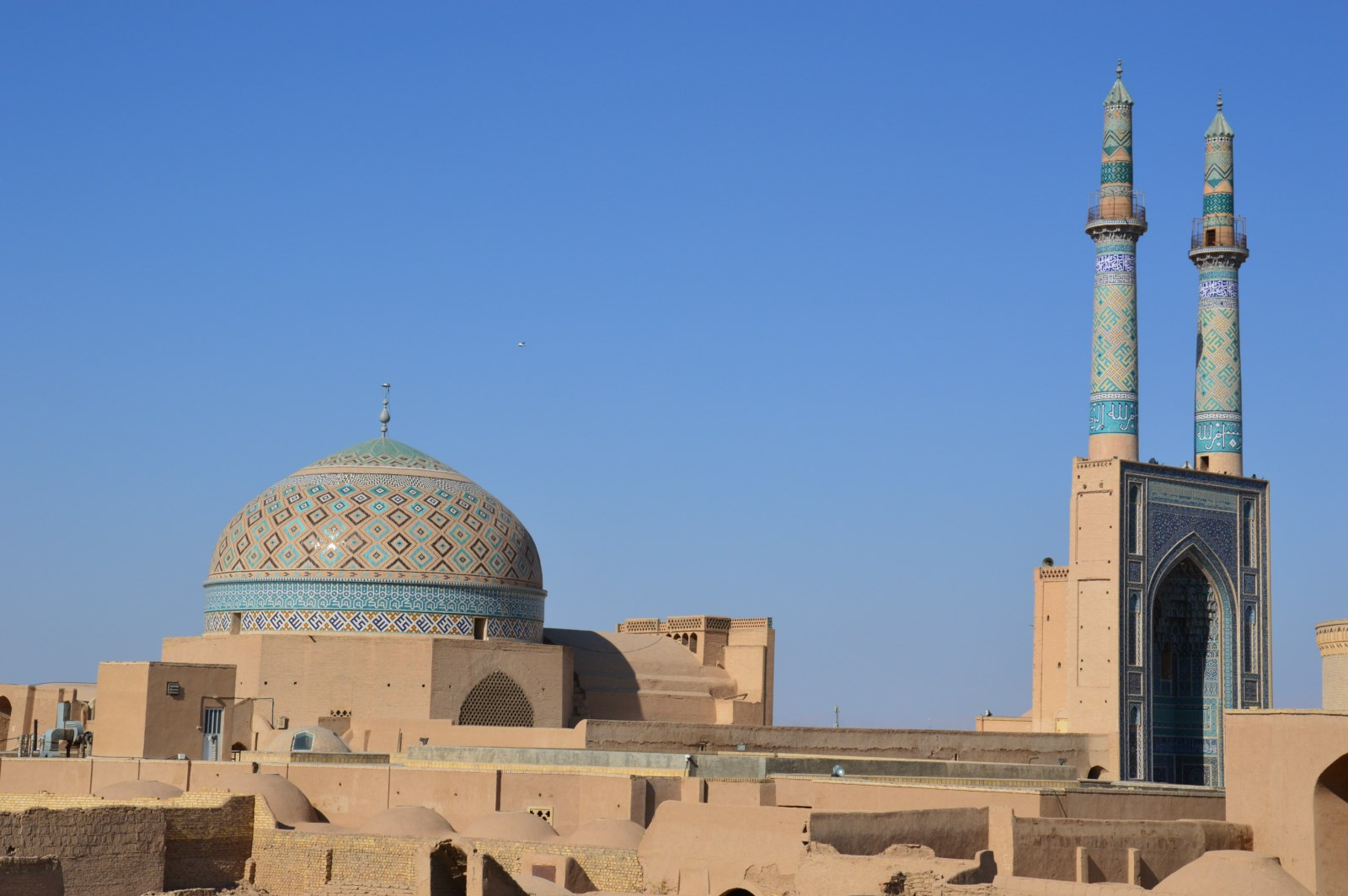
Jameh Mosque of Yazd

- Amir Chakhmaq Mosque
  - Amir Chakhmaq Complex
- Chahar Suq and Hajj Muhammad Husayn Mosque
- Jameh Mosque of Abarkuh
- Jameh Mosque of Ardakan
- Jameh Mosque of Eslamiyeh
- Jameh Mosque of Fahraj
- Jameh Mosque of Yazd
- Zir Deh Mosque

=== Zanjan ===
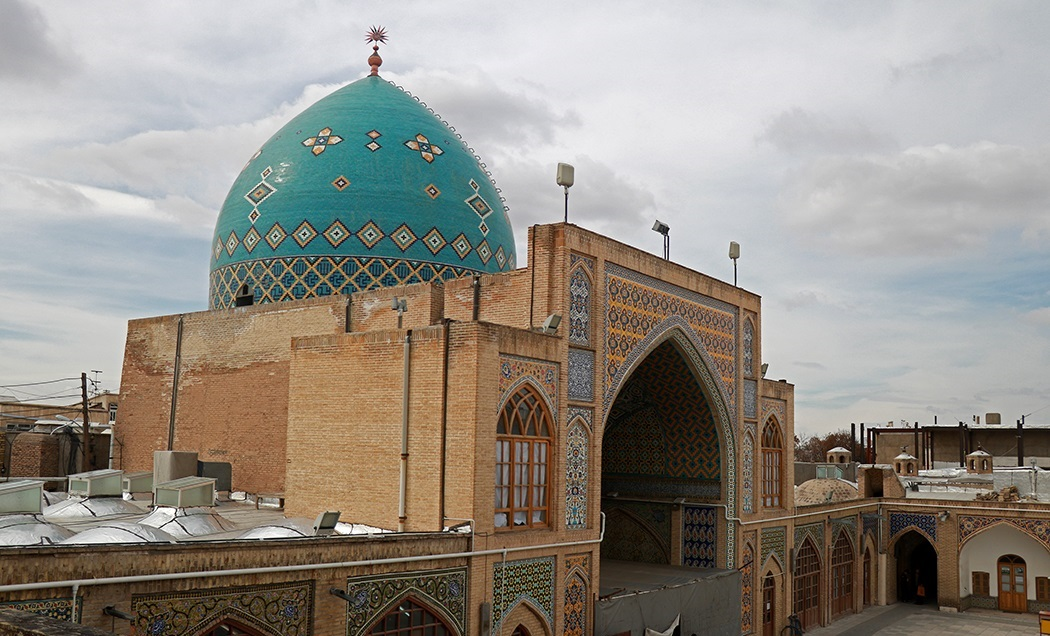
Jameh Mosque of Zanjan

- Hosseinieh Azam Zanjan Mosque
- Khanom Mosque
- Jameh Mosque of Qerveh
- Jameh Mosque of Sojas
- Jameh Mosque of Zanjan

== Holy sites for Twelver Shi'ites ==
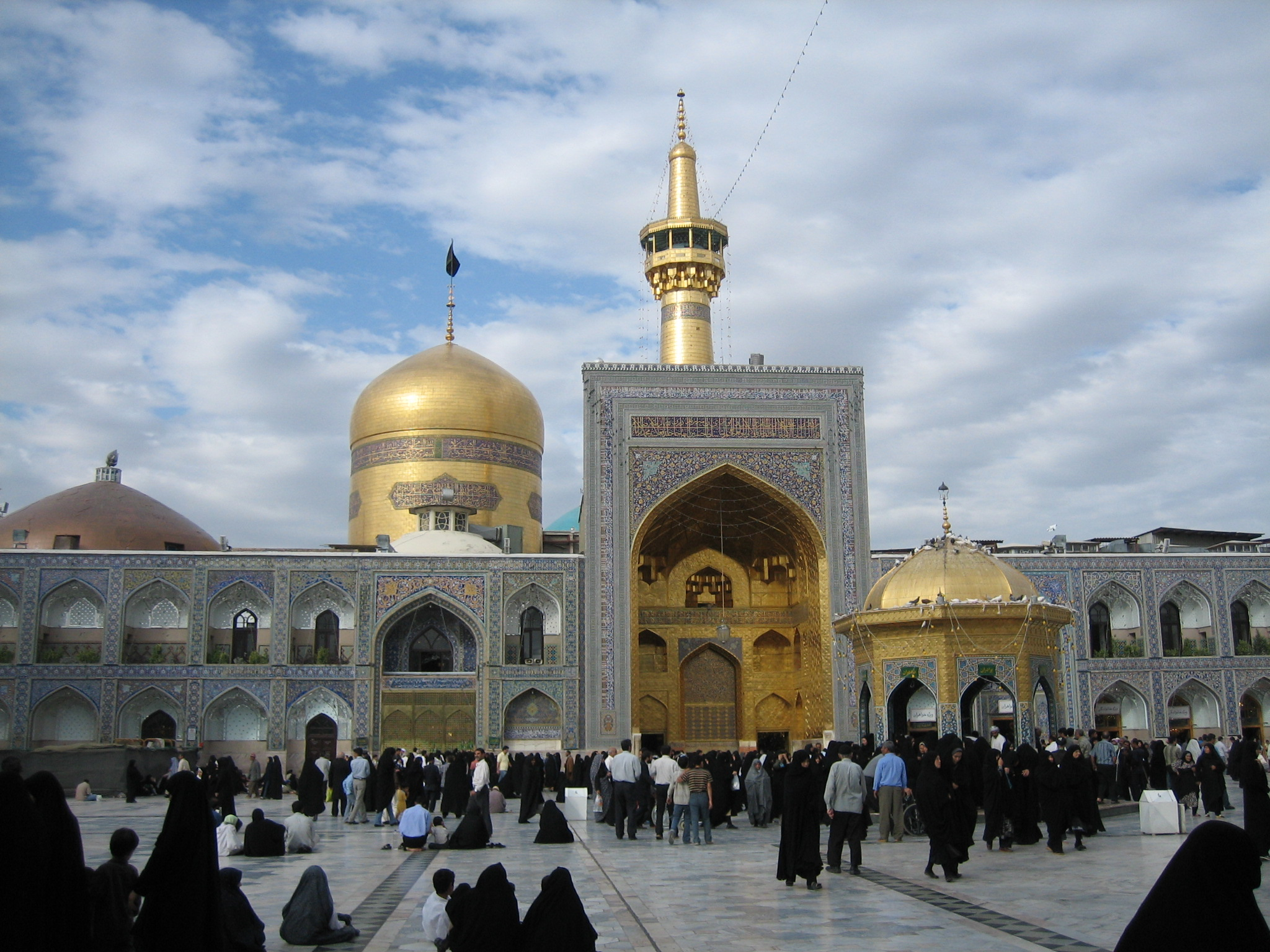
Imam Reza shrine

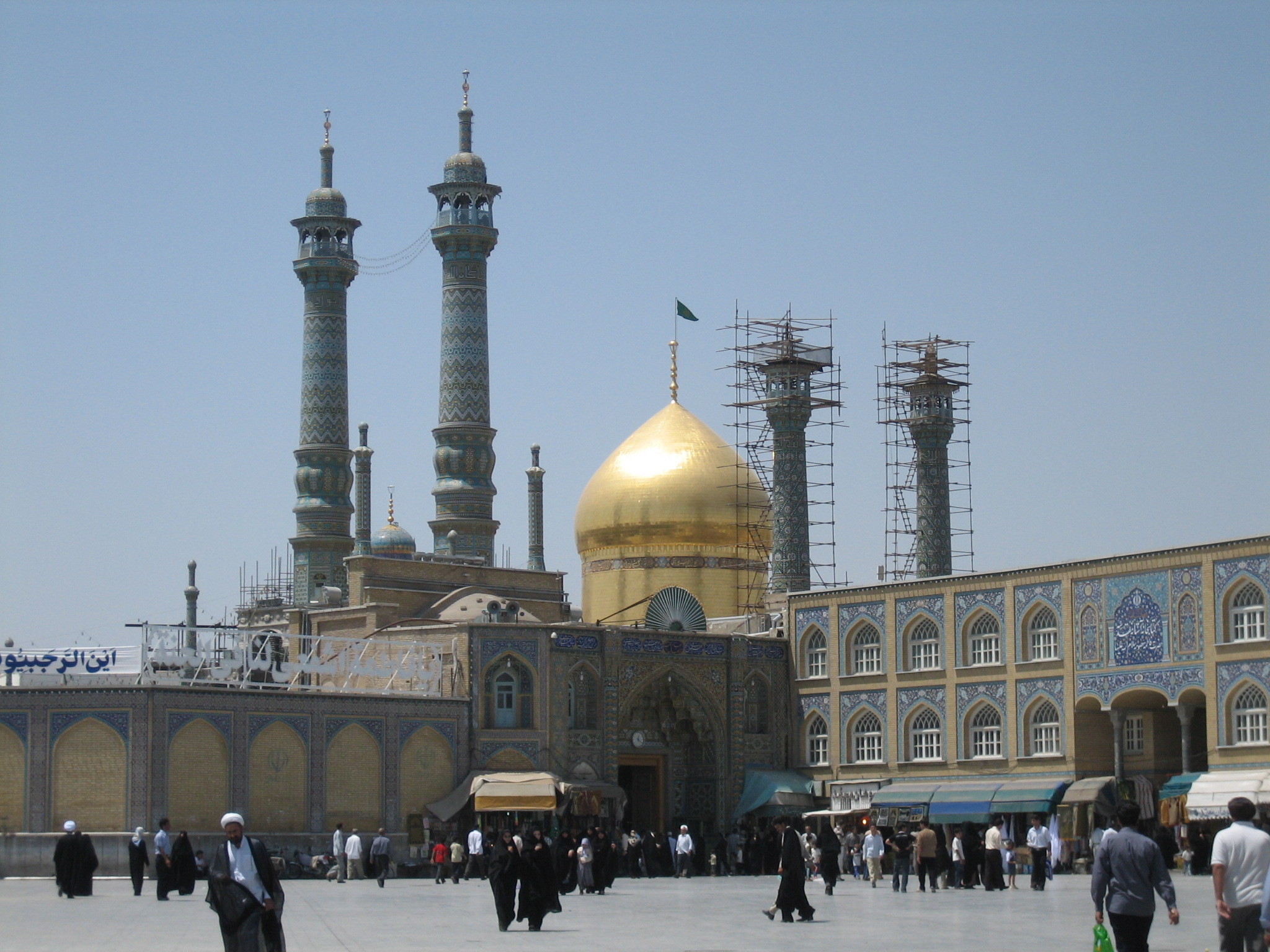
Fatima Masumeh Shrine

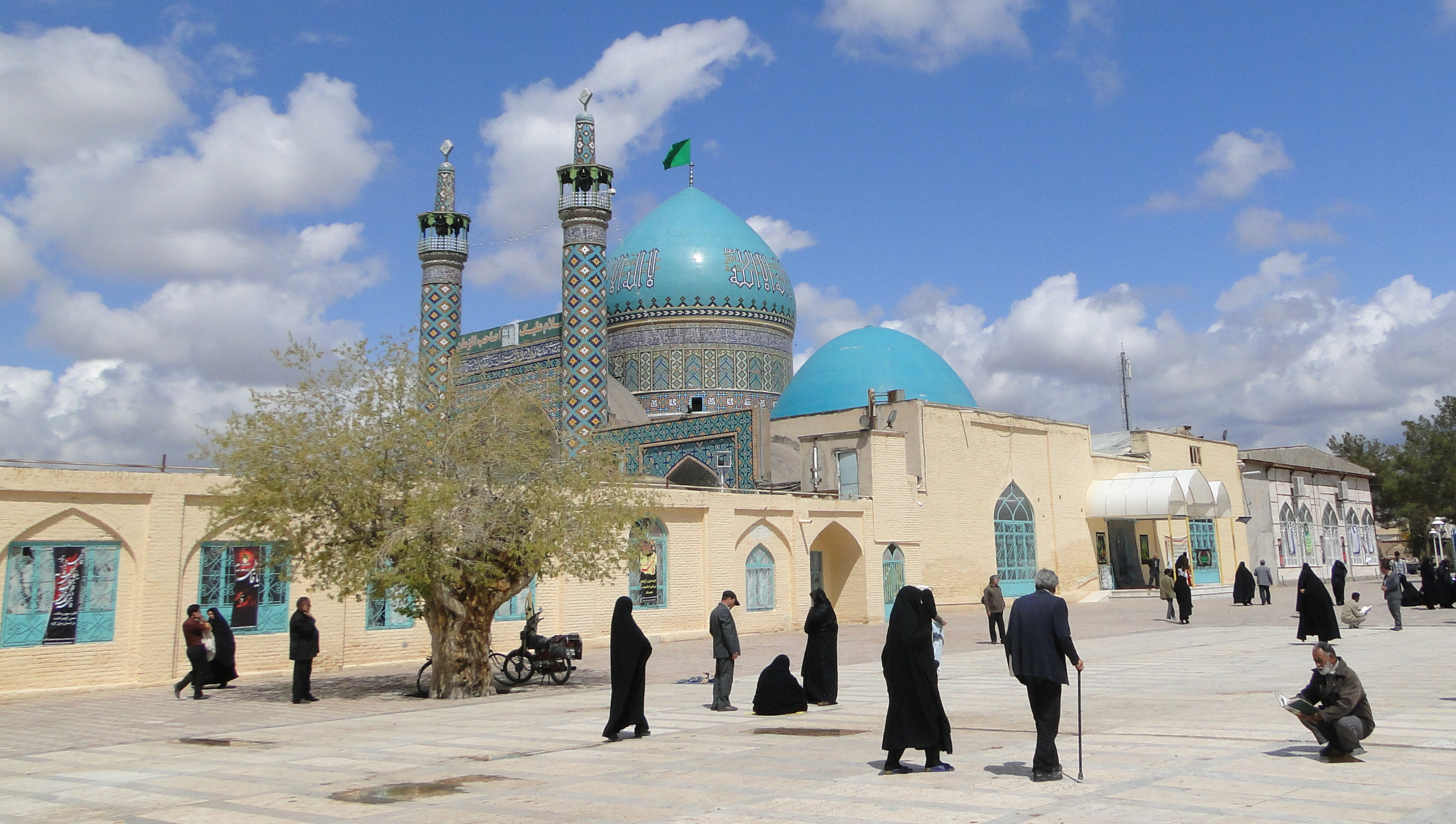
Imamzadeh Hamzeh, Kashmar

- Bibi Shahr Banu Shrine
- Fatima Masumeh Shrine
- Hosseinieh Azam Zanjan Mosque
- Imam Reza shrine
- Imamzadeh Davood
- Imamzadeh Esmaeil and Isaiah mausoleum
- Imamzadeh Hadi
- Imamzadeh Hamzeh, Kashmar
- Imamzadeh Hamzah, Tabriz
- Imamzadeh Ja'far, Borujerd
- Imamzade Hossein, Qazvin
- Imamzadeh Saleh, Shemiran
- Imamzadeh Seyed Mohammad
- Imamzadeh Seyed Morteza
- Imamzadeh Shahreza
- Imamzadeh Shahzadeh Hoseyn
- Kushk Complex
- Mausoleum of Ruhollah Khomeini
- Shah Abdol-Azim shrine
- Shah Cheragh
- Tomb of Daniel
- Tomb of Hassan Modarres

== See also ==
- Islam in Iran
- List of mosques
