= List of grand mosques =

A grand mosque, or congregational mosque, Friday mosque, great mosque or jama masjid, is a type of mosque which is the main mosque of a certain area that hosts the special Friday noon prayers known as jumu'ah. The following is a list of congregational mosques by country or region.

== Africa ==
=== Algeria ===
- 1st November of 1954 Great Mosque
- Great Mosque of Algiers (disambiguation)
- Great Mosque of Nedroma
- Great Mosque of Tlemcen

=== Cameroon ===
- Lamido Grand Mosque, in N'Gaoundere

=== Egypt ===
- Mosque of Amr ibn al-As
- Ibn Tulun Mosque
- Al-Azhar Mosque
- Al-Nasir Muhammad Mosque
- Abu al-Abbas al-Mursi Mosque in Alexandria

=== Eritrea ===
- Great Mosque of Asmara

=== Ethiopia ===
- Jamia Mosque, Harar

=== Guinea ===
- Grand Mosque of Conakry

=== Kenya ===
- Jamia Mosque in Kenya

=== Mali ===
- Grand Mosque of Bamako
- Great Mosque of Djenné
- Grand Mosque of Mopti
- Great Mosque of Niono Ségou Region, southern Mali

=== Mauritania ===
- Friday Mosque of Nouakchott

=== Morocco ===
- Al-Qarawiyyin Mosque
- Grand Mosque of Chefchaouen
- Great Mosque of Fes el-Jdid
- Grand Mosque of Oujda
- Great Mosque, Rabat
- Great Mosque of Salé
- Grand Mosque of Tangier
- Great Mosque of Taza
- Mosque of the Andalusians

=== Niger ===
- Grand Mosque of Niamey

=== Nigeria ===
- Abuja National Mosque in Abuja, FCT
- Great Mosque of Kano
- Lagos Central Mosque in Lagos, Lagos State

=== Senegal ===
- Grand Mosque of Dakar
- Great Mosque of Touba

=== Somalia ===
- Jama'a Xamar Weyne in Mogadishu
- Jama'a Shingani in Mogadishu

=== Somaliland ===
- Jama Mosque in Hargeisa

=== South Africa ===
- Juma Mosque in Durban

=== Tanzania ===
- Great Mosque of Kilwa Kisiwani

=== Tunisia ===
- Al-Zaytuna Mosque in Tunis
- Great Mosque of Kairouan
- Great Mosque of Mahdiya
- Great Mosque of Monastir
- Great Mosque of Sfax
- Great Mosque of Sousse
- Great Mosque of Testour

== Asia ==
=== Afghanistan ===
- Great Mosque of Herat
- Jama Masjid of Balkh – ruins, located in Balkh, Afghanistan

=== Azerbaijan ===
- Juma Mosque in Baku
- Shah Abbas' Juma Mosque in Ganja
- Juma Mosque in Nakhchivan
- Juma Mosque in Ordubad
- Juma Mosque in Shamakhi

=== Bangladesh ===
- Munshibari Jama Masjid in Taltoli, Comilla
- Baitul Mukarram, Dhaka
- Choto Sona Mosque, Chapai Nawabganj
- Sixty Dome Mosque, Bagerhat

=== Bahrain ===
- Al Fateh Grand Mosque, in Manama

=== China ===
- Great Mosque of Xi'an, Xi'an (previously Chang'an), capital of Shaanxi Province
- Great Mosque of Canton (Huaisheng Mosque), Guangzhou, Capital of Guangdong Province
- Jamia Mosque in Hong Kong
- Lhasa Great Mosque
- Taizi Great Mosque
- Tongxin Great Mosque

=== Kuwait ===
- Grand Mosque of Kuwait, Kuwait City

=== India ===
Andaman and Nicobar Islands

- Jama Mosque, Delanipur in Port Blair

Andhra Pradesh

- Shahi Jamia Mosque in Adoni

Delhi

- Jama Masjid in old Delhi
- Shia Jama Masjid in old Delhi

Gujarat

- Jama Masjid in Ahmedabad
- Jama Mosque in Champaner

Himachal Pradesh

- Jama Masjid in Dharamshala

Hyderabad

- Jama Mosque in Golconda

Jharkhand

- Jama Mosque in Ramgarh

Jammu and Kashmir

- Jamia Masjid in Srinagar
- Jamia masjid in Shopian

Karnataka

- Jama Masjid, in Bidar
- Jama Masjid in Bijapur
- Kama Masjid in Kalaburagi
- Masjid Zeenath Baksh in Mangalore

Kerala

- Jamiul Futuh - The Indian Grand Masjid
- Cheraman Juma Mosque in Kodungallur
- Juma Masjid in Pullancheri
- Palayam Juma Masjid in Thiruvananthapuram (Trivandrum)
- Thazhathangady Juma Masjid in Kottayam

Madhya Pradesh

- Jama Masjid in Mandu

Maharashtra

- Jama Masjid in Aurangabad
- Jama Masjid in Erandol
- Jama Masjid in Mumbai
- Jama Masjid in Mominpura, Nagpur
- Jama Masjid in Nerul
- Jama Mosque in Furus, Ratnagiri district

Tamil Nadu

- Kazimar Big Mosque in Madurai
- Goripalayam Mosque in Madurai
- Sungam Mosque in Madurai
- Palaiya Jumma Palli in Kilakarai
- Athar Jamad Mosque in Coimbatore
- Kottaimedu Mosque in Coimbatore

Telangana

- Jama Masjid, Hyderabad
- Jama Mosque, Golconda in Hyderabad
- Makkah Masjid in Hyderabad

Uttar Pradesh

- Great Mosque, Budaun
- Jama Masjid in Agra
- Jama Masjid in Fatehpur Sikri
- Jama Masjid in Jaunpur
- Jama Masjid in Lucknow
- Jama Masjid in Mathura

West Bengal

- Jama Masjid, Motijheel, in Murshidabad
- Adina Mosque in Malda
- Tipu Sultan Mosque in Kolkata

=== Indonesia ===
==== Borneo ====
- Darussalam Great Mosque, Samarinda, East Kalimantan
- Samarinda Islamic Center Mosque, East Kalimantan
- Grand Mosque of Sabilal Muhtadin, South Kalimantan
- Great Mosque of Riyadusshalihin, South Kalimantan

==== Java ====
- Al-Azhom Grand Mosque, Banten
- Al-Bantani Grand Mosque, Banten
- Great Mosque of Banten
- Istiqlal Mosque, Jakarta
- Al-Azhar Great Mosque, Jakarta
- KH Hasyim Asy'ari Grand Mosque, Jakarta
- Jakarta Islamic Center
- Al Jabbar Grand Mosque, West Java
- Dian Al-Mahri Mosque, West Java
- Grand Mosque of Bandung, West Java
- Manonjaya Great Mosque, West Java
- Great Mosque of Cirebon, West Java
- Demak Great Mosque, Central Java
- Great Mosque of Central Java
- Great Mosque of Surakarta, Central Java
- Sheikh Zayed Grand Mosque, Solo, Central Java
- Kauman Great Mosque, Yogyakarta
- Al-Akbar Mosque, East Java
- Great Mosque of Sumenep, East Java
- Great Mosque of Malang, East Java
- Al-Akbar Mosque East Java

==== Lesser Sunda Islands ====
- Darussalam Great Mosque, West Sumbawa, West Nusa Tenggara

==== Sulawesi ====
- Al-Markaz Al-Islami Mosque, South Sulawesi
- Grand Mosque of Makassar, South Sulawesi

==== Sumatra ====
- Baiturrahman Grand Mosque, Aceh
- Baitul Makmur Meulaboh Grand Mosque, Aceh
- Grand Mosque of Medan, North Sumatra
- An-Nur Great Mosque Pekanbaru, Riau
- Ganting Grand Mosque, West Sumatra
- Grand Mosque of West Sumatra
- Andalas Grand Mosque, West Sumatra
- Akbar At-Taqwa Grand Mosque, Bengkulu
- Great Mosque of Palembang, South Sumatra
- Baitul Mukhlisin Islamic Center Mosque, Lampung
- Grand Mosque of the Sultan of Riau, Riau Islands

=== Iran ===
- Jameh Mosque of Abarkuh
- Jameh Mosque of Ahar
- Jameh Mosque of Amol
- Jameh Mosque of Aradan
- Jameh Mosque of Ardakan
- Jameh Mosque of Ardestan
- Jameh Mosque of Arak
- Jameh Mosque of Arsanjan
- Jameh Mosque of Ashtarjan
- Jameh Mosque of Atigh
- Jameh Mosque of Babol
- Jameh Mosque of Bandar Abbas
- Jameh Mosque of Bastak
- Jameh Mosque of Bersian
- Jameh Mosque of Borujerd
- Jameh Mosque of Damavand
- Jameh Mosque of Damghan
- Jameh Mosque of Darab
- Jameh Mosque of Dezful
- Jameh Mosque of Eslamiyeh
- Jameh Mosque of Fahraj
- Jameh Mosque of Fathabad
- Jameh Mosque of Ferdows
- Jameh Mosque of Farumad
- Jameh Mosque of Germi
- Jameh Mosque of Golpayegan
- Jameh Mosque of Gonabad
- Jameh Mosque of Gorgan
- Jameh Mosque of Gugan
- Jameh Mosque of Hamadan
- Jameh Mosque of Isfahan
- Jameh Mosque of Jahrom
- Jameh Mosque of Jajarm
- Jameh Mosque of Kabir Neyriz
- Jameh Mosque of Kashan
- Jameh Mosque of Kashmar
- Jameh Mosque of Kerman
- Jameh Mosque of Kermanshah
- Jameh Mosque of Khansar
- Jameh Mosque of Khozan
- Jameh Mosque of Lar
- Jameh Mosque of Makki
- Jameh Mosque of Mehrabad
- Jameh Mosque of Marand
- Jameh Mosque of Marandiz
- Jameh Mosque of Nain
- Jameh Mosque of Namin
- Jameh Mosque of Natanz
- Jameh Mosque of Nishapur
- Jameh Mosque of Nushabad
- Jameh Mosque of Pachian
- Jameh Mosque of Qazvin
- Jameh Mosque of Qerveh
- Jameh Mosque of Qeshm
- Jameh Mosque of Qiblah
- Jameh Mosque of Qom
- Jameh Mosque of Radkan
- Jameh Mosque of Raqqeh
- Jameh Mosque of Sabzevar
- Jameh Mosque of Sarab
- Jameh Mosque of Sarabi
- Jameh Mosque of Sari
- Jameh Mosque of Sanandaj
- Jameh Mosque of Saveh
- Jameh Mosque of Semnan
- Jameh Mosque of Shafi‘i
- Jameh Mosque of Shahrud
- Jameh Mosque of Shushtar
- Jameh Mosque of Sojas
- Jameh Mosque of Tabriz
- Jameh Mosque of Takab
- Jameh Mosque of Tehran
- Jameh Mosque of Urmia
- Jameh Mosque of Varamin
- Jameh Mosque of Yazd
- Jameh Mosque of Zanjan
- Jameh Mosque of Zavareh

=== Iraq ===
- Great Mosque of al-Mansur, Baghdad
- Great Mosque of Kufa
- Great Mosque, Aqrah
- Great Mosque of Samarra
- Great Mosque of al-Nuri, Mosul
- Great Mosque of Amadiya

=== Lebanon ===
- Al-Omari Grand Mosque, in Beirut
- Mansouri Great Mosque, in Tripoli
- Great Mosque of Baalbek (Umayyad Mosque of Baalbek)

=== Malaysia ===
- Masjid Jamek in Kuala Lumpur
- National Mosque of Malaysia in Kuala Lumpur

=== Maldives ===
- Malé Hukuru Miskyii in Malé

=== Mongolia ===
- Great Mosque of Hohhot

=== Nepal ===
- Jama Masjid Rahmaniya, Bhairahawa (Nepal)

=== Oman ===
- Sultan Qaboos Grand Mosque, in the Sultanate of Oman

=== Pakistan ===
- Badshahi Masjid in Lahore, Punjab
- Faisal Mosque, Islamabad
- Grand Jamia Mosque, Karachi
- Grand Jamia Mosque, Lahore
- Lal Masjid. Islamabad
- Grand Mosque Allahabad, in Kandiaro, Sindh
- Jamia Masjid in Sialkot, Punjab
- Jamia Mosque in Khudabad, Sindh
- Shah Jahan Mosque in Thatta, Sindh

=== Palestine ===
- Al-Aqsa Mosque complex (third holiest site in Islam)
- Great Mosque of Gaza
- Great Mosque of Jenin, the Fatima Khatun Mosque
- Great Mosque of Nablus

=== Saudi Arabia ===
- Great Mosque of Mecca (Masjid al-Haram); the location of the Kaaba and the main site of the Hajj pilgrimage (largest mosque and holiest site in Islam)
- Prophet's Mosque in Medina (second largest mosque and holiest site in Islam)

=== Singapore ===
- Masjid Jamae; grand mosque of Chinatown
- Masjid Jamek Queenstown; grand mosque of Margaret Drive
- Masjid Temenggong Daeng Ibrahim; grand mosque of Telok Blangah during colonial times

=== Sri Lanka ===
- Grand Mosque of Colombo

=== Syria ===
- Great Mosque of Aleppo
- Great Mosque of al-Nuri, Homs
- Great Mosque of Damascus (Umayyad Mosque)
- Great Mosque of Hama
- Great Mosque of Maarrat al-Numan
- Great Mosque of Raqqa

=== Taiwan ===
- Taipei Grand Mosque, in Taipei

=== Turkey ===
- Blue Mosque, Istanbul
- Divriği Great Mosque and Hospital
- Hagia Sophia
- Great Mosque of Adana
- Grand Mosque of Bursa
- Great Mosque of Diyarbakır
- Grand Mosque of Erzurum
- Grand Mosque of Mersin
- Grand Mosque of Tarsus
- Grand Mosque of Urfa
- Grand Mosque of Uşak
- Kocatepe Mosque, Ankara

=== United Arab Emirates ===
- Sheikh Zayed Grand Mosque in Abu Dhabi
- Grand Mosque in Dubai

=== Uzbekistan ===
- Dzhuma Mosque

=== Yemen ===
- Great Mosque of Sanaa, Yemen
- Great Mosque of Zabid, Yemen, al-Asha'ir Mosque

== Europe ==
=== Albania ===
- Great Mosque of Durrës
- Namazgah Mosque

=== Belgium ===
- Great Mosque of Brussels

=== Dagestan (Republic of Dagestan) ===
- Grand Mosque of Makhachkala

=== Denmark ===
- Grand Mosque of Copenhagen

=== France ===
- Grand Mosque of Évry, Paris
- Grand Mosque of Paris

=== Russia ===
- Akhmad Kadyrov Mosque in Grozny
- Grand Mosque in Makhachkala
- Moscow Cathedral Mosque
- Kul Sharif Mosque, Kazan
- Saint Petersburg Mosque

=== Spain ===
- Great Mosque of Córdoba, the Mosque–Cathedral of Córdoba
- Great Mosque of Seville, now Seville Cathedral

=== Ukraine ===
- Ahat Jami Mosque in Donetsk
- Juma-Jami Mosque in Yevpatoria

=== United Kingdom ===
- Jami Masjid and Islamic Centre in Birmingham, West Midlands
- Jaame Masjid in Blackburn, Lancashire
- Jamea Masjid in Preston, Lancashire
- Leeds Grand Mosque, in Leeds, England
- London Great Mosque, now the Brick Lane Mosque
- North Manchester Jamia Mosque in Greater Manchester

== The Americas ==
- Great Mosque of Quebec City, Canada
- Jami Mosque, Toronto, Canadá
- Jama Mosque, Barbados
- Jama Mosque, Panama City, Panama
