= Jameh Mosque of Shahrud =

Mosque in Shahrud, Semnan province, Iran

Jāmeh Mosque of Shahrud
- مسجد جامع شاهرود
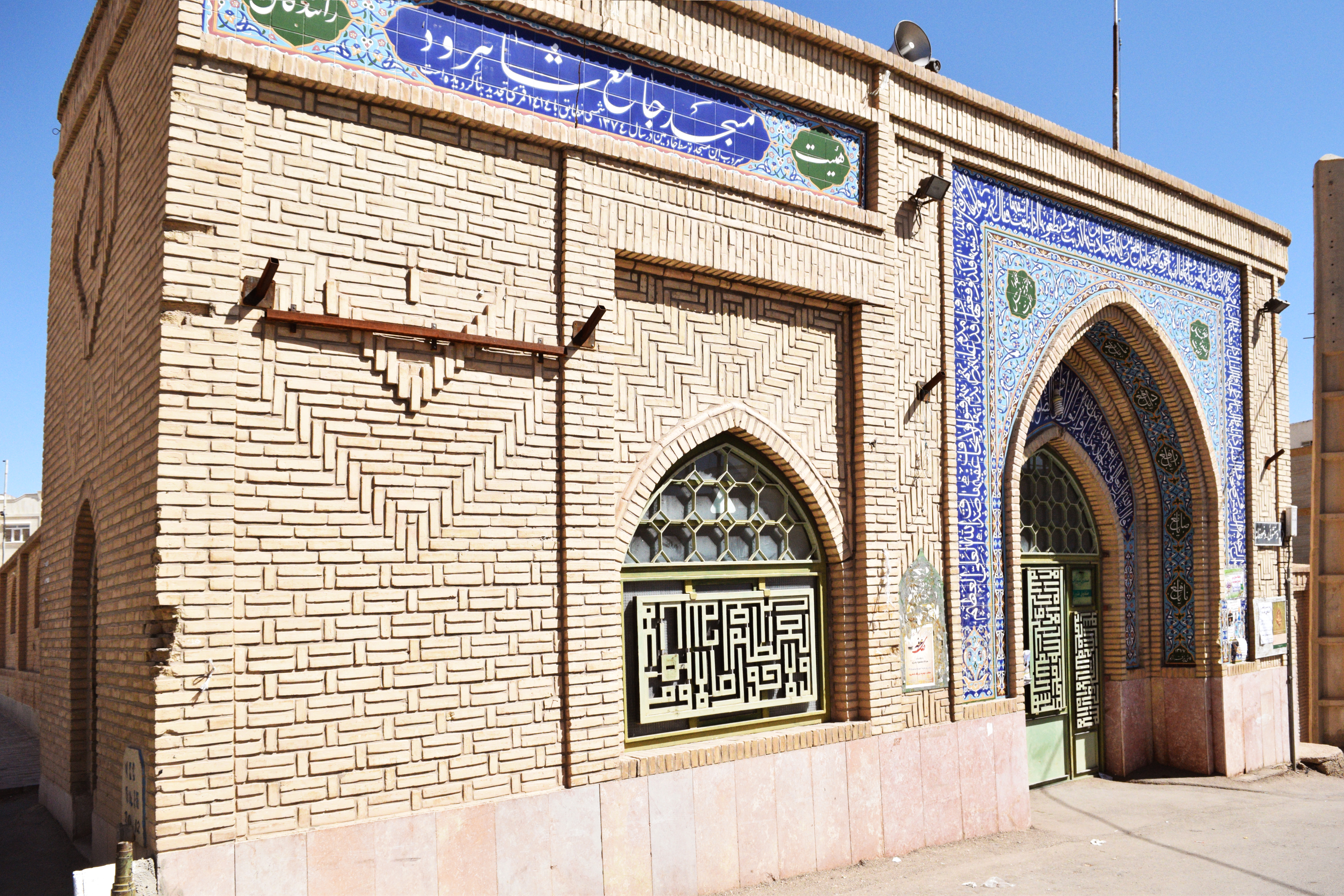
- The mosque entrance in 2015

- Location of the mosque in Iran

Religion
- Affiliation: Shia Islam
- Ecclesiastical or organizational status: Friday mosque
- Status: Active

Location
- Location: Shahrud, Semnan Province
- Country: Iran
- Interactive map of Jāmeh Mosque of Shahrud
- Coordinates: 36°25′31″N 54°57′32″E

Architecture
- Type: Mosque architecture
- Style: Ilkhanid; Qajar
- Completed: 1863 (renovation)

Specifications
- Dome: One (maybe more)
- Materials: Bricks; adobe; tiles

Iran National Heritage List
- Official name: Jāmeh Mosque of Shahrud
- Type: Built
- Designated: 5 May 1997
- Reference no.: 1856
- Conservation organization: Cultural Heritage, Handicrafts and Tourism Organization of Iran

The Jāmeh Mosque of Shahrud (Persian: مسجد جامع شاهرود; Arabic: جامع شاهرود) is a Shi'ite Friday mosque (jāmeh), located in Shahrud, in the province of Semnan, Iran. Commenced during the Ilkhanate era, the mosque was renovated in 1863, during the Qajar era.

The mosque was added to the Iran National Heritage List on 5 May 1997, administered by the Cultural Heritage, Handicrafts and Tourism Organization of Iran.

== See also ==
- Shia Islam in Iran
- List of mosques in Iran
