= Jameh Mosque of Radkan =

Mosque in Radkan, Razavi Khorasan, Iran

Jāmeh Mosque of Radkan
- مسجد جامع رادکان
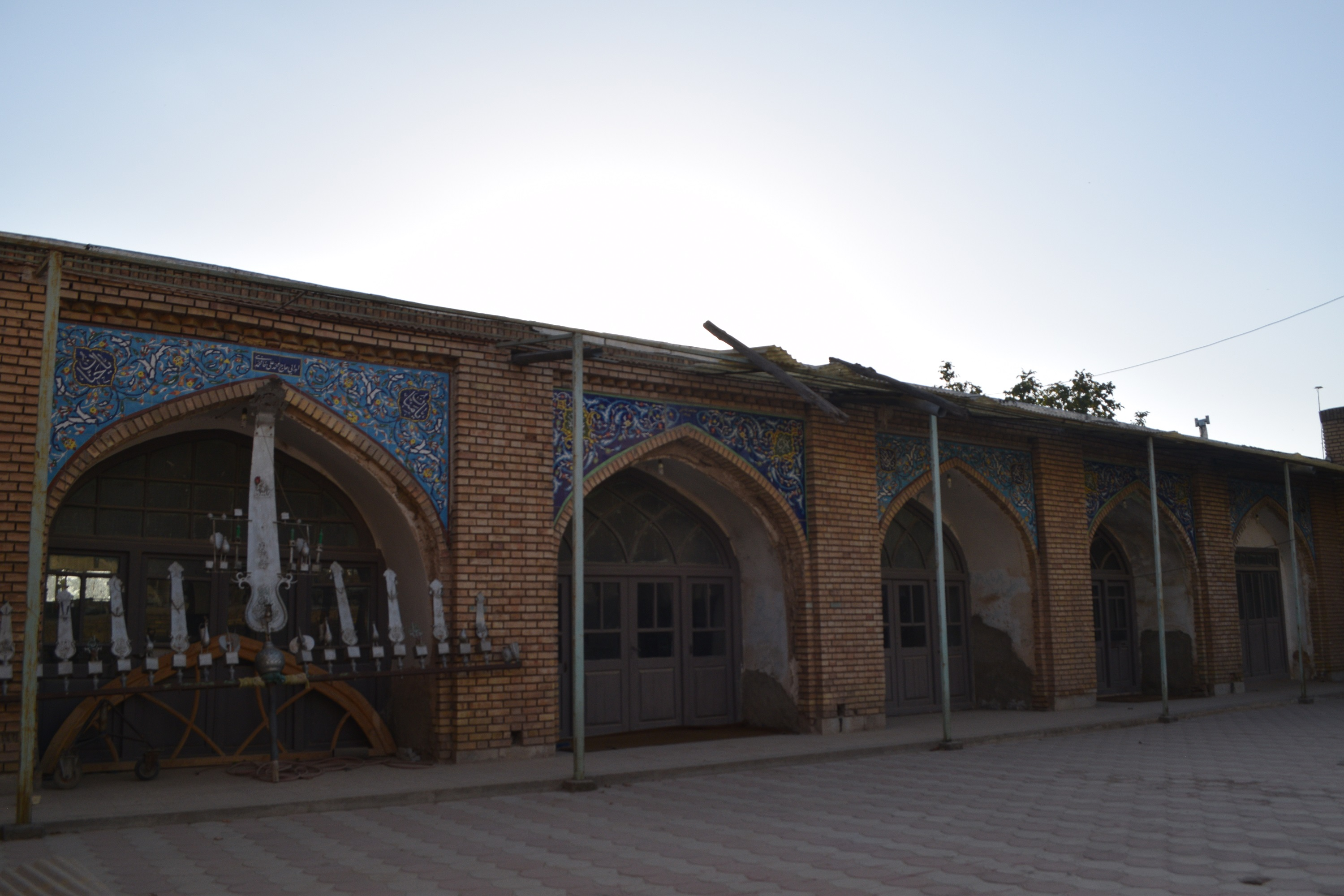
- The mosque in 2015

- Location of the mosque in Iran

Religion
- Affiliation: Shia Islam
- Ecclesiastical or organizational status: Friday mosque
- Status: Active

Location
- Location: Radkan, Razavi Khorasan Province
- Country: Iran
- Interactive map of Jāmeh Mosque of Radkan
- Coordinates: 36°48′7″N 59°0′41″E

Architecture
- Type: Mosque architecture
- Style: Timurid; Safavid
- Completed: 1914 CE (renovations)

Specifications
- Dome: One (maybe more)
- Materials: Bricks; mortar; tiles

Iran National Heritage List
- Official name: Jāmeh Mosque of Radkan
- Type: Built
- Designated: 31 December 2002
- Reference no.: 6658
- Conservation organization: Cultural Heritage, Handicrafts and Tourism Organization of Iran

The Jāmeh Mosque of Radkan (مسجد جامع رادکان; Arabic: جامع رادكان) is a Shi'ite Friday mosque (jāmeh) located in the village of Radkan, in the central part of Chenaran County, in the province of Razavi Khorasan, Iran.

The mosque was completed in the late Timurid and Safavid eras, and was added to the Iran National Heritage List on 31 December 2002, administered by the Cultural Heritage, Handicrafts and Tourism Organization of Iran.

== See also ==
- Shia Islam in Iran
- List of mosques in Iran
