= Grand Mosque of Makhachkala =

Main mosque in Dagestan, Russia

Yusuf Bei Camii Russian: Джума мечеть Махачкалы
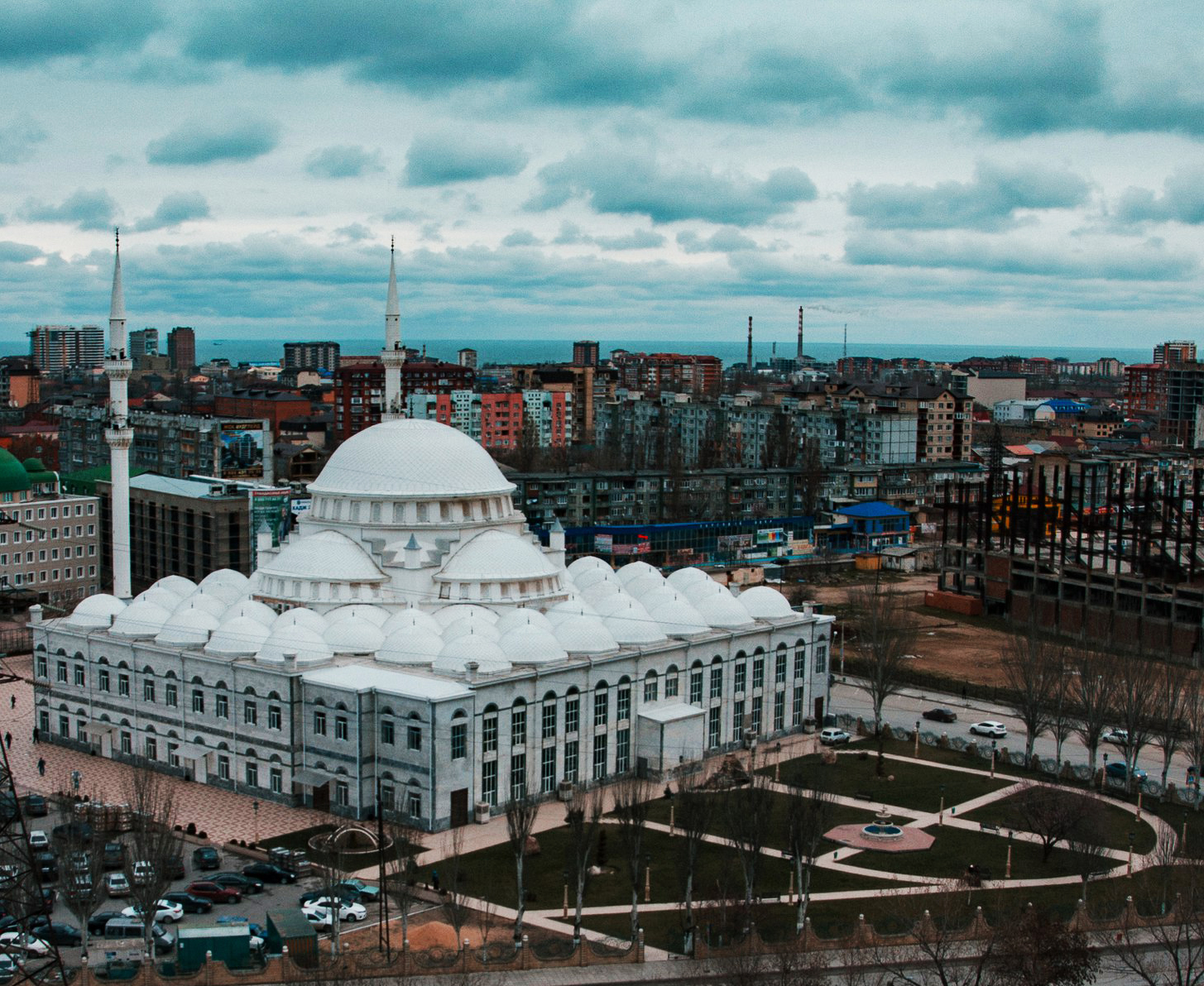

Religion
- Affiliation: Sunni Islam
- Status: Active

Location
- Location: Makhachkala, Dagestan, Russia
- Interactive map of Yusuf Bei Camii; Russian: Джума мечеть Махачкалы
- Coordinates: 42°58′09″N 47°29′38″E

Architecture
- Type: Ottoman
- Completed: 1998; 28 years ago

Specifications
- Capacity: 17,000
- Dome: 57
- Minaret: 2
- Minaret height: 42 m (137 ft)

The Grand Mosque of Makhachkala (Russian: Центральная Джума-мечеть) or Yusuf Bei Camii is the main mosque of the Republic of Dagestan, located in Makhachkala, Russia.

== History ==
The construction of the mosque was started in 1991 thanks to the financing of one of the wealthy Turkish families. The mosque was completed and consecrated in 1998. The first imam was the Turk Hafiz Aydin. In 2004–2007 the building was reconstructed in order to increase its capacity to 15 thousand people. In July 2007, a telethon was held in Makhachkala, thanks to which more than 25 million rubles were collected to expand the mosque and improve the surrounding area. As of 2021 the imam is Muhammad Atangulov.

== Architecture ==
The design of the mosque follows the Blue Mosque in Istanbul, Turkey. The building can accommodate up to 17,000 worshipers. It is the focal point of the city's main thoroughfare, Imam Shamil Avenue.

== Finance ==
Its construction was financed by Turkey.

== See also ==
- Islam in Russia
- List of mosques in Russia
- List of mosques in Europe
