= Jameh Mosque of Ahar =

Mosque in East Azerbaijan, Iran

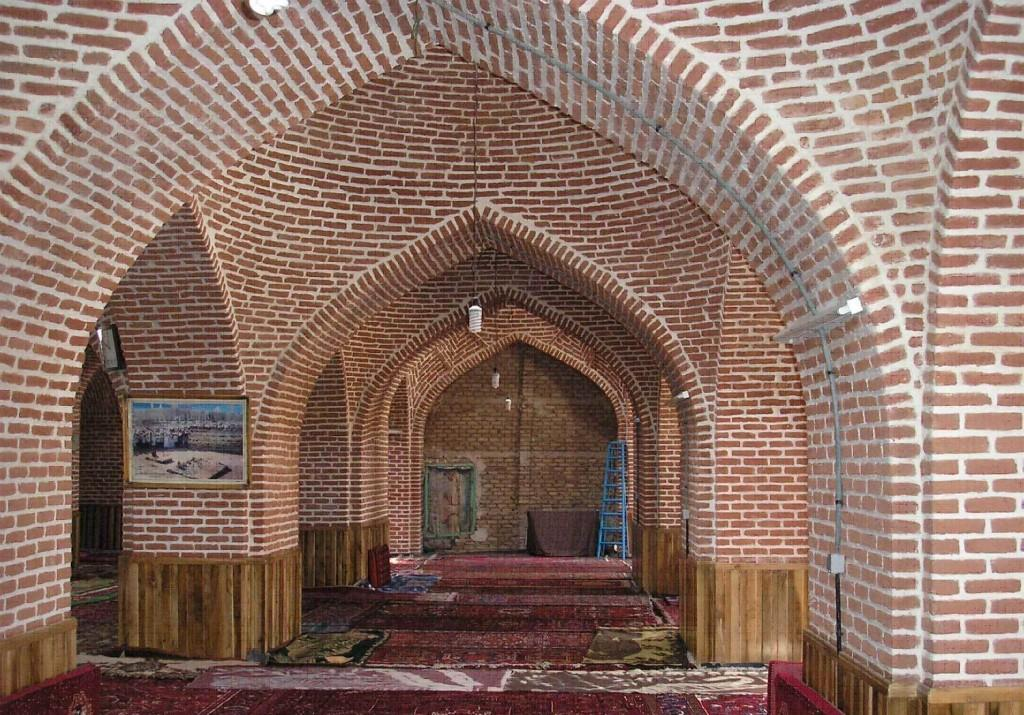
- The mosque in 2018

- Location of the mosque in Iran

Religion
- Affiliation: Shia Islam
- Ecclesiastical or organizational status: Friday mosque
- Status: Active

Location
- Location: Ahar, East Azerbaijan
- Country: Iran
- Interactive map of Jameh Mosque of Ahar
- Coordinates: 38°28′20″N 47°04′07″E

Architecture
- Type: Mosque architecture
- Style: Safavid
- Completed: Ilkhanate; Safavid era; 1052 AH (1642/1643 CE) (renovations)

Specifications
- Dome: One (maybe more)
- Materials: Bricks

The Jameh Mosque of Ahar is a Shi'ite Friday mosque, located in Ahar, in the province of East Azerbaijan, Iran. The mosque was built during either the Ilkhanate or Safavid eras. Inscriptions on the mosque mark that additional work was completed in 1052 AH (1642/1643 CE).

== See also ==
- Shia Islam in Iran
- List of mosques in Iran
