= Jameh Mosque of Hamadan =

Shi'ite mosque in Hamadan, Iran

- مسجد جامع همدان
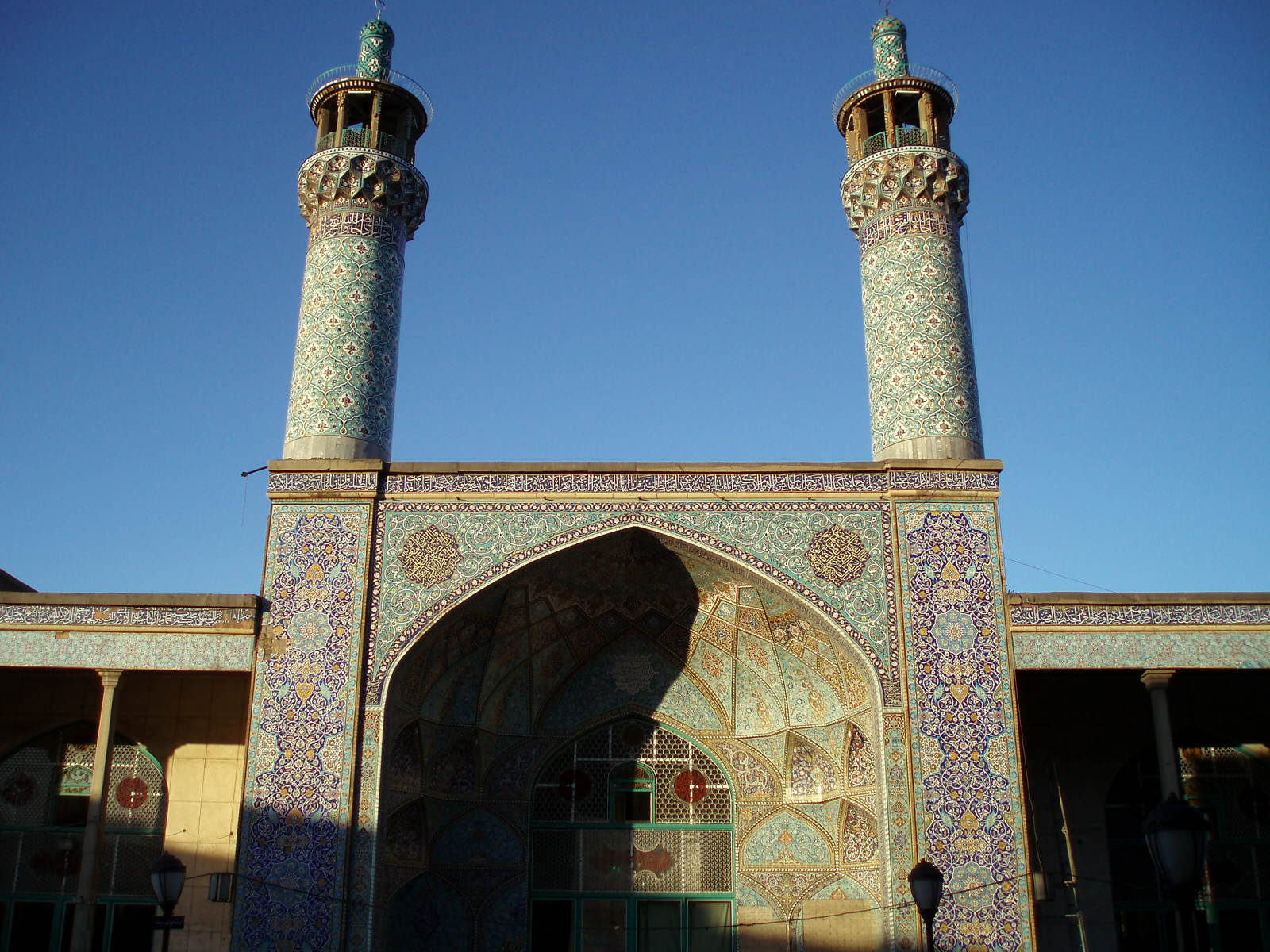
- Entrance iwan in 2007

- Location of the mosque in Iran

Religion
- Affiliation: Shia Islam
- Ecclesiastical or organisational status: Friday mosque
- Status: Active

Location
- Location: Hamadan, Hamadan province
- Interactive map of Jameh Mosque of Hamadan
- Coordinates: 34°48′00″N 48°30′52″E

Architecture
- Type: Mosque architecture
- Style: Qajar

Specifications
- Dome: One
- Minaret: Two

Iran National Heritage List
- Official name: Jameh Mosque of Hamadan
- Type: Built
- Designated: 15 June 1996
- Reference no.: 1733
- Conservation organization: Cultural Heritage, Handicrafts and Tourism Organization of Iran

The Jameh Mosque of Hamadan (Persian: مسجد جامع همدان; Arabic: جامع همدان) is a Shi'ite Friday mosque, located in the city of Hamadan, in the province of Hamadan, Iran. The mosque was completed during the Qajar era.

The mosque was added to the Iran National Heritage List on 15 June 1996 and is administered by the Cultural Heritage, Handicrafts and Tourism Organization of Iran.

== See also ==
- List of mosques in Iran
- Shia Islam in Iran
