= Dzhuma Mosque, Tashkent =

Khoja Ahror Valiy mosque Uzbek: Xo'ja Ahror Valiy masjidi
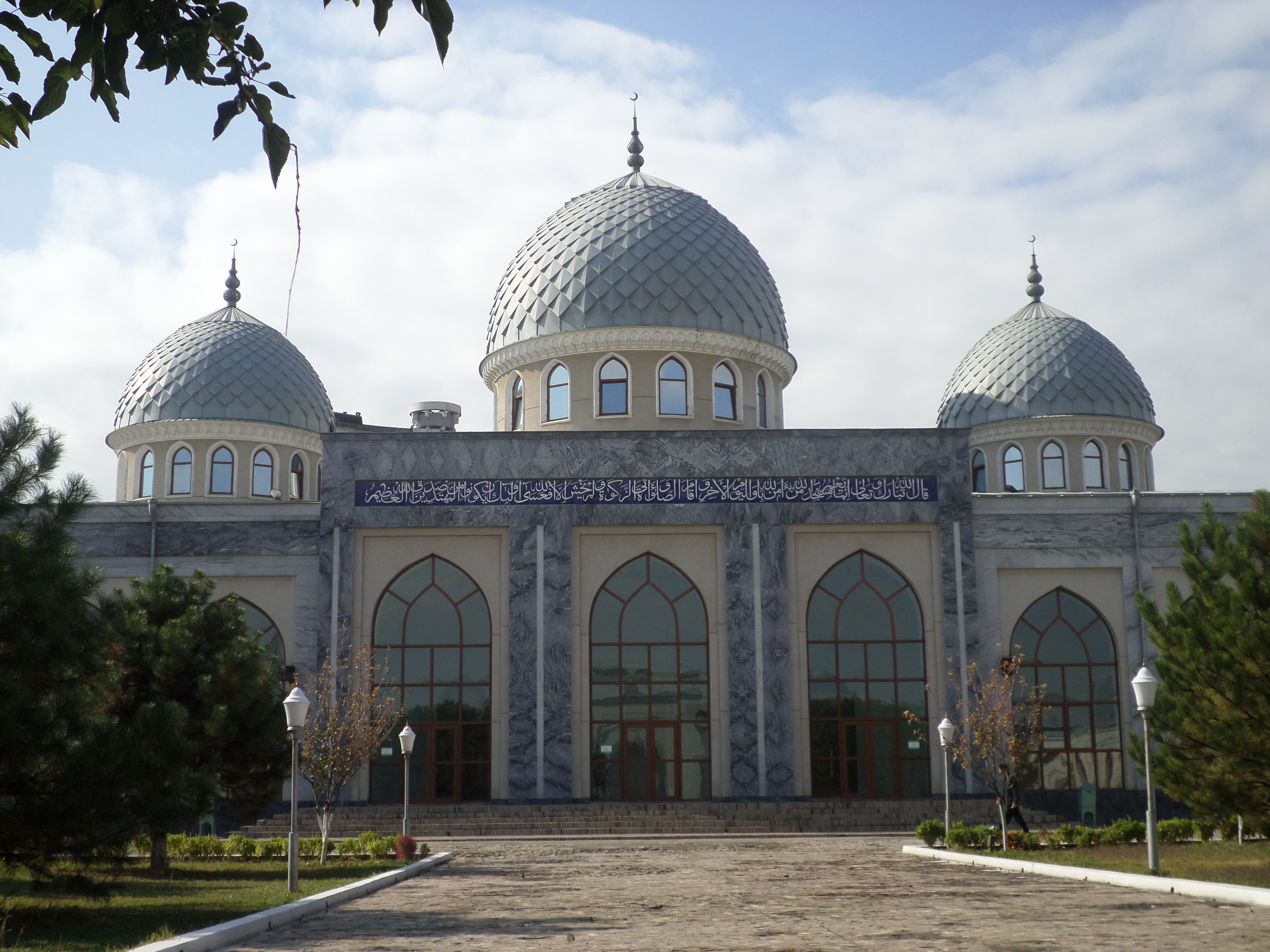
- Khoja Ahror Valiy mosque, October 2014

- Location in Tashkent, the capital of Uzbekistan
- 41.323653°N 69.237311°E
- Type: mosque
- Location: Tashkent, Uzbekistan

History
- Built: 819 – 2003

Khoja Ahror Valiy mosque is a mosque in Tashkent, Uzbekistan. Also known as the Jama or Dzhuma Mosque, it was built in 1451 by Sheikh Ubaydullo Khoja Akhror (1404–1490).

== See also ==
- List of first mosques by country
- Jama masjid
