= Jameh Mosque of Nushabad =

Mosque in Nushabad, Isfahan, Iran

Jāmeh Mosque of Nushabad
- مسجد جامع نوش‌آباد
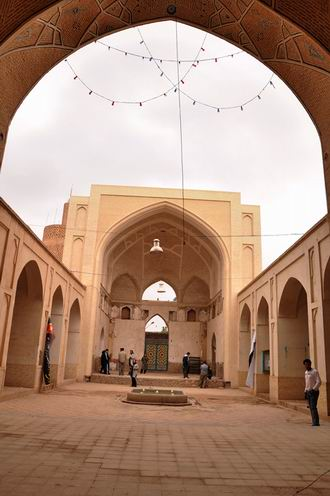
- The mosque sahn in 2011

- Location of the mosque in Iran

Religion
- Affiliation: Shia Islam
- Ecclesiastical or organizational status: Friday mosque
- Status: Active

Location
- Location: Nushabad, Isfahan province
- Country: Iran
- Interactive map of Jāmeh Mosque of Nushabad
- Coordinates: 34°04′41″N 51°26′15″E

Architecture
- Type: Mosque architecture
- Style: Seljuk; Safavid; Qajar
- Completed: 12th century CE; 1596 CE (southeast); 1723 CE (southwest)

Specifications
- Dome: One
- Minaret: One
- Minaret height: 16.75 m (55.0 ft)
- Materials: Bricks; plaster; tiles

Iran National Heritage List
- Official name: Jāmeh Mosque of Nushabad
- Type: Built
- Designated: 9 May 1998
- Reference no.: 2015
- Conservation organization: Cultural Heritage, Handicrafts and Tourism Organization of Iran

The Jāmeh Mosque of Nushabad (Persian: مسجد جامع نوش‌آباد; Arabic: جامع نوش آباد) is a Shi'ite Friday mosque (jāmeh) located in Nushabad, in the province of Isfahan, Iran.

The mosque was added to the Iran National Heritage List on 9 May 1998, administered by the Cultural Heritage, Handicrafts and Tourism Organization of Iran.

The mosque was built between the 12th century CE, during the Seljuk era, and was completed in 1723 CE, during the Qajar era.

== See also ==
- Shia Islam in Iran
- List of mosques in Iran
- List of historical structures in Isfahan province
