= Jameh Mosque of Sari =

Shi'ite mosque in Sari, Mazandaran, Iran

Jāmeh Mosque of Sari
- مسجد جامع ساری
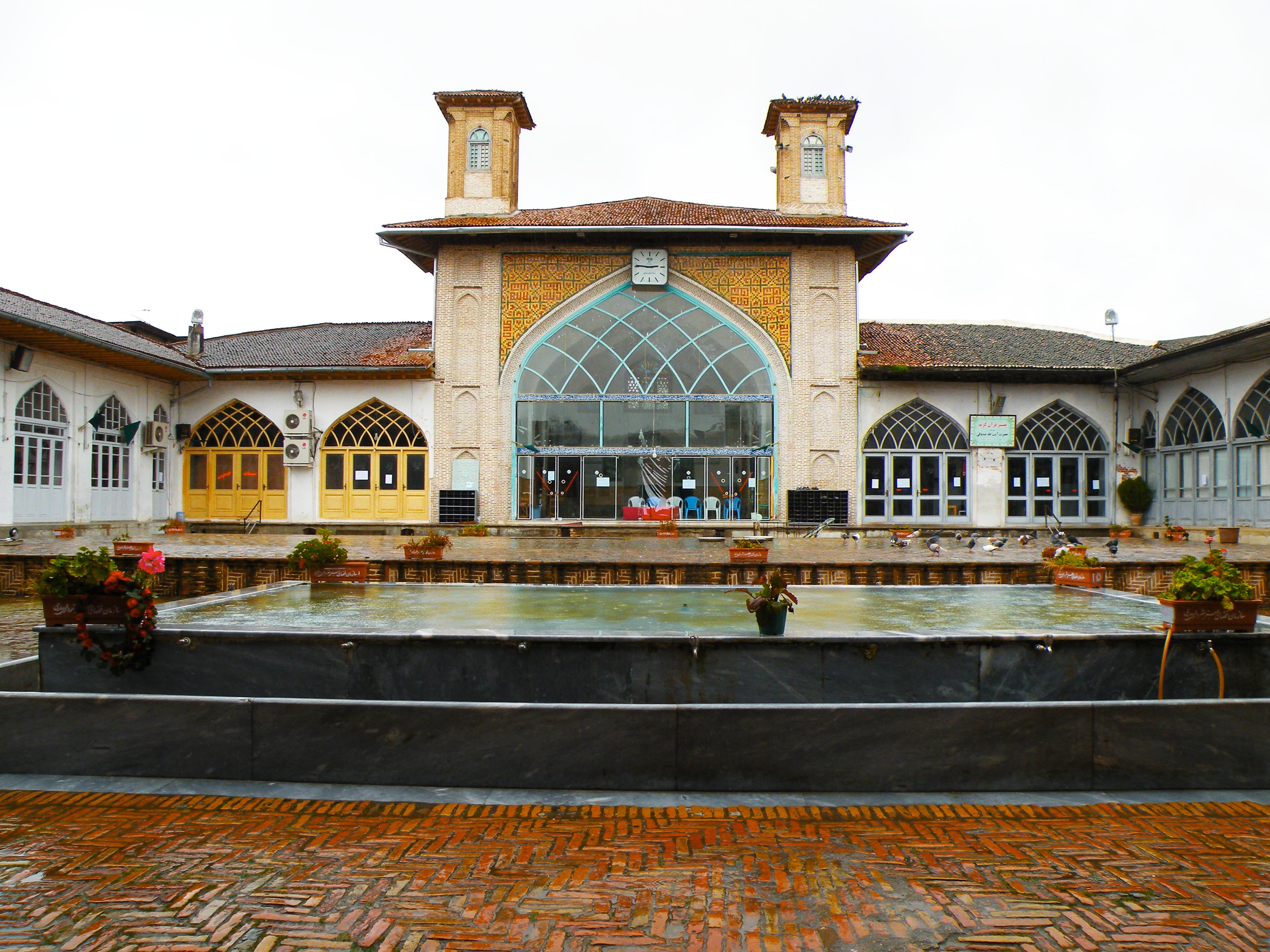
- The mosque in 2011, prior to the fire

- Location of the mosque in Iran

Religion
- Affiliation: Shia Islam
- Ecclesiastical or organizational status: Friday mosque
- Status: Active

Location
- Location: Sari, Mazandaran Province
- Country: Iran
- Interactive map of Jāmeh Mosque of Sari
- Coordinates: 36°33′50″N 53°03′28″E

Architecture
- Type: Mosque architecture
- Style: Qajar
- Completed: 144 AH (761/762 CE); 2019 (rebuild following fire)
- Destroyed: 1397 AH (1976/1977 CE) (by fire)

Specifications
- Dome: One (maybe more)
- Minaret: Two
- Materials: Bricks; mortar

Iran National Heritage List
- Official name: Jāmeh Mosque of Sari
- Type: Built
- Designated: 27 February 1999
- Reference no.: 2272
- Conservation organization: Cultural Heritage, Handicrafts and Tourism Organization of Iran

The Jāmeh Mosque of Sari (Persian: مسجد جامع ساری; Arabic: جامع ساري) is a Shi'ite Friday mosque (Jāmeh), located in Sari, in the district of Chinarban, in the province of Mazandaran, Iran. The current Qajar era structure is devoid of any historical relics. It has a square sahn, nocturnal areas and a porch.

The mosque was added to the Iran National Heritage List on 27 February 1999, administered by the Cultural Heritage, Handicrafts and Tourism Organization of Iran. However, this building was substantially destroyed by fire in 2018.

== Overview ==
The Jameh Mosque of Sari is located in Nargesiye daily market in Chenarbon district in Sari, the capital city of Mazandaran Province, in the north of Iran. It dates from the pre-Islam era and used to be a fire temple of Zoroastrians. After the acceptance of Islam by the people in the region, a mosque, known as Jameh Mosque, was constructed on the site of the temple. It is the first mosque built in the north of Iran.

Approximately seventy percent of the Qajar era mosque was destroyed by fire on 12 July 2018, attributed to an electrical fault. The mosque was rebuilt and reopened in 2019.

The mosque is managed by the General Directorate of Endowments and Charity Affairs of Mazandaran. The religious affairs of the mosque are administered by six prayer leaders. Prominent clerics of the city and province have always led the prayers in this mosque. Ayatollah Reza Ghouyomi (founder of Quran recitation and prayer sessions at Sari schools), Ayatollah Saadat Saravi, and Ayatollah Sedoghi were among the prayer leaders at the mosque.

== Gallery ==
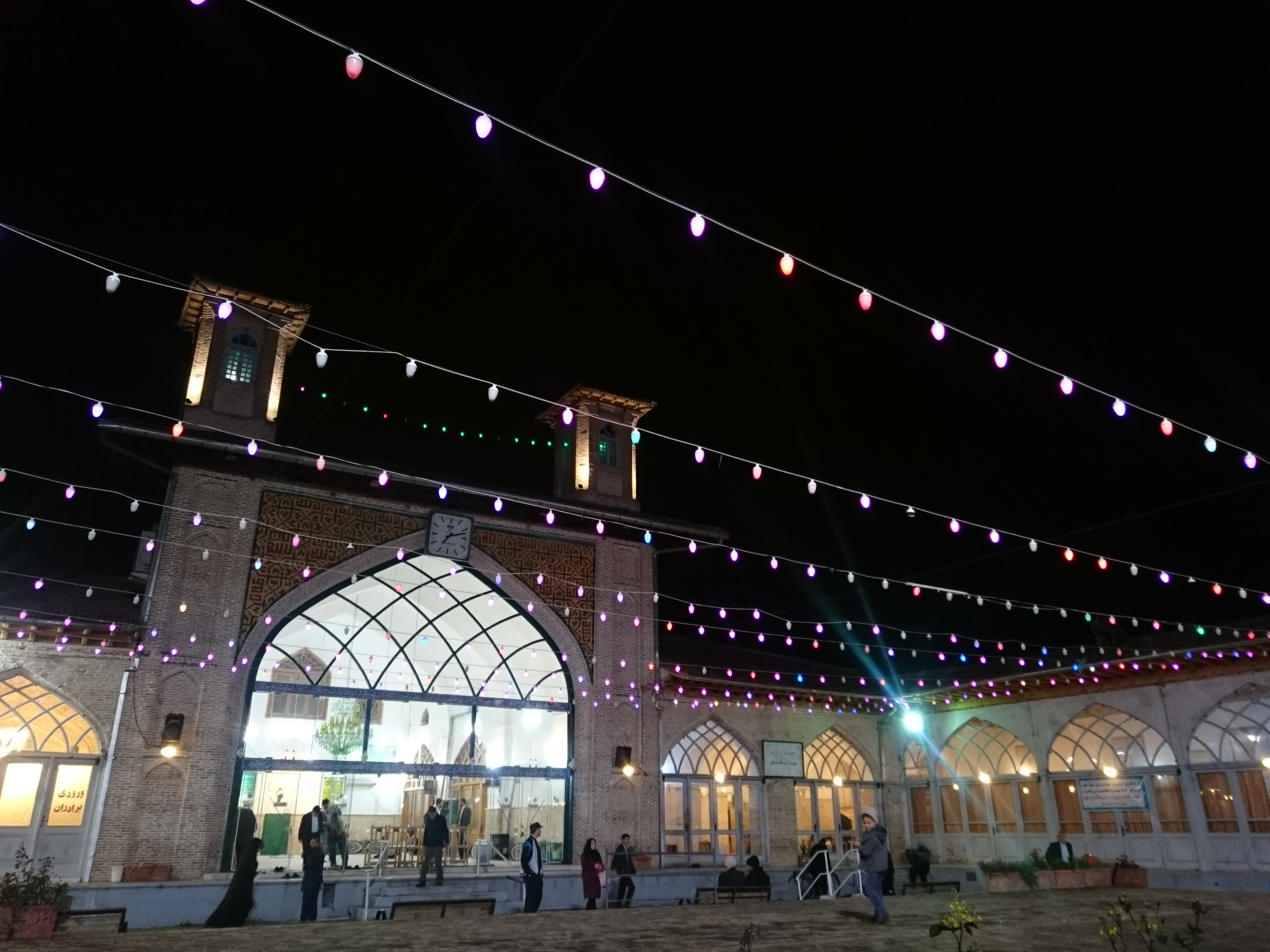
The mosque at night, in 2016

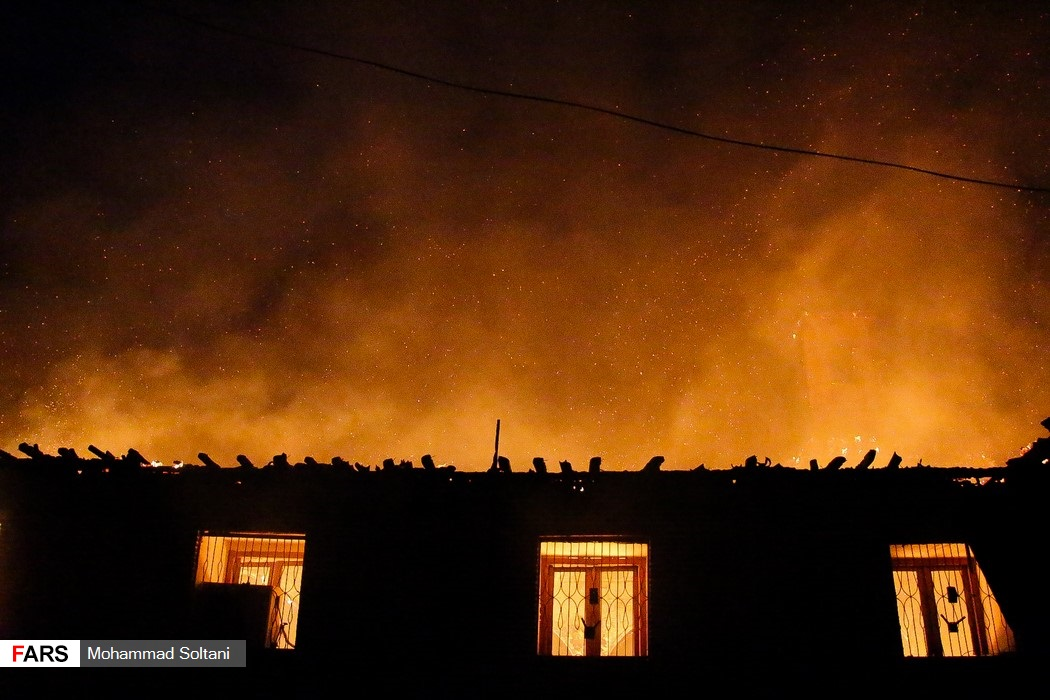
The mosque on fire, in 2018

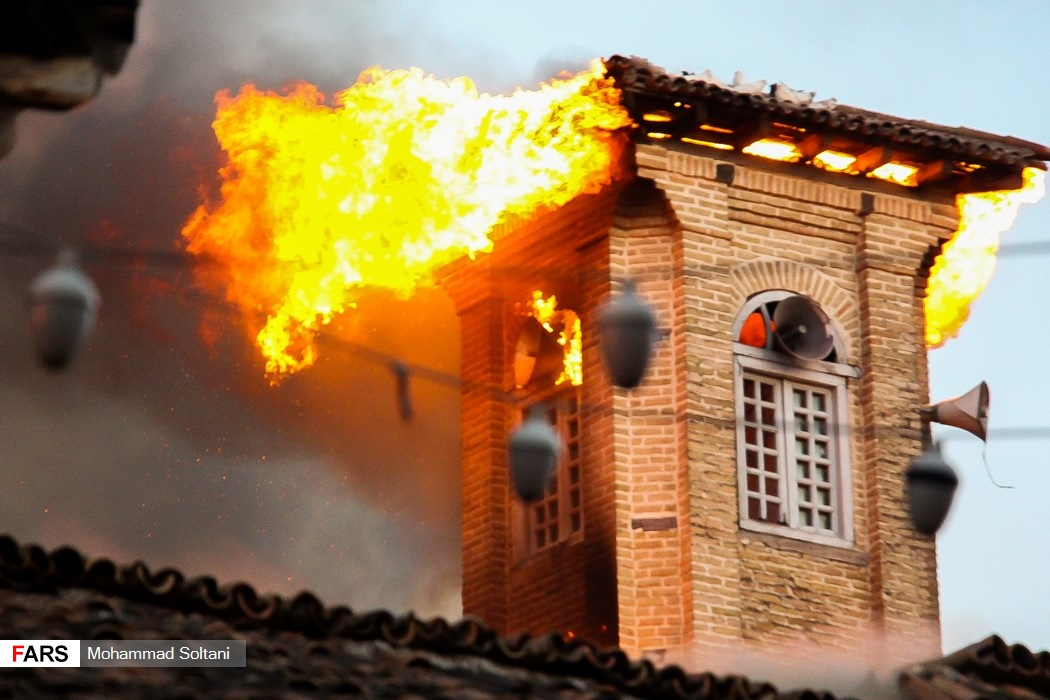
The minaret on fire, in 2018

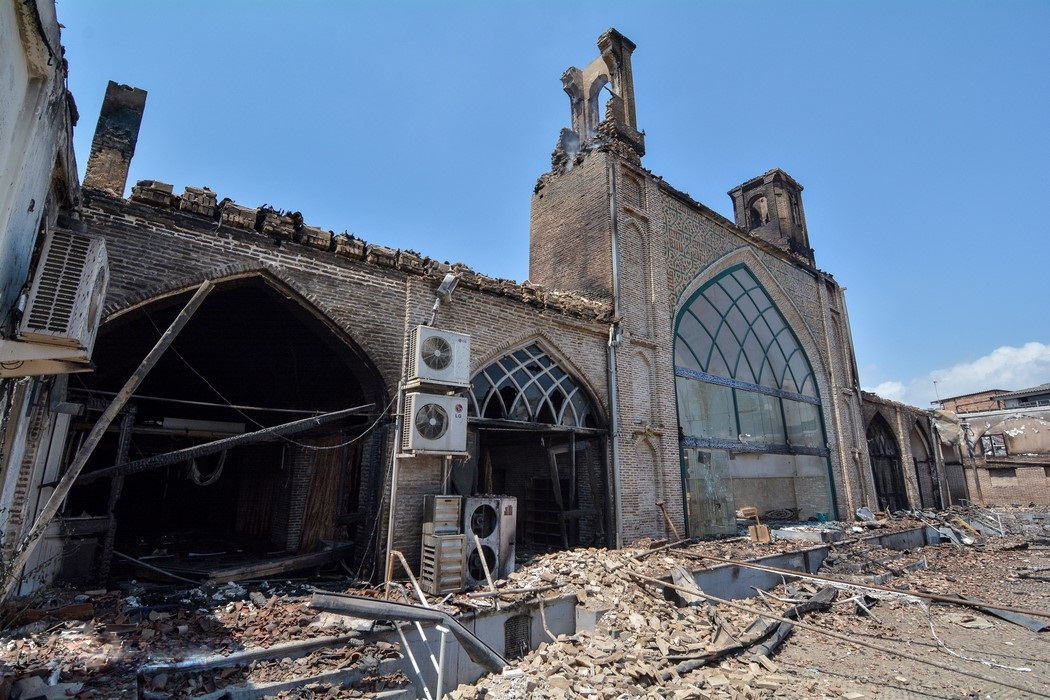
The day after the 2018 fire

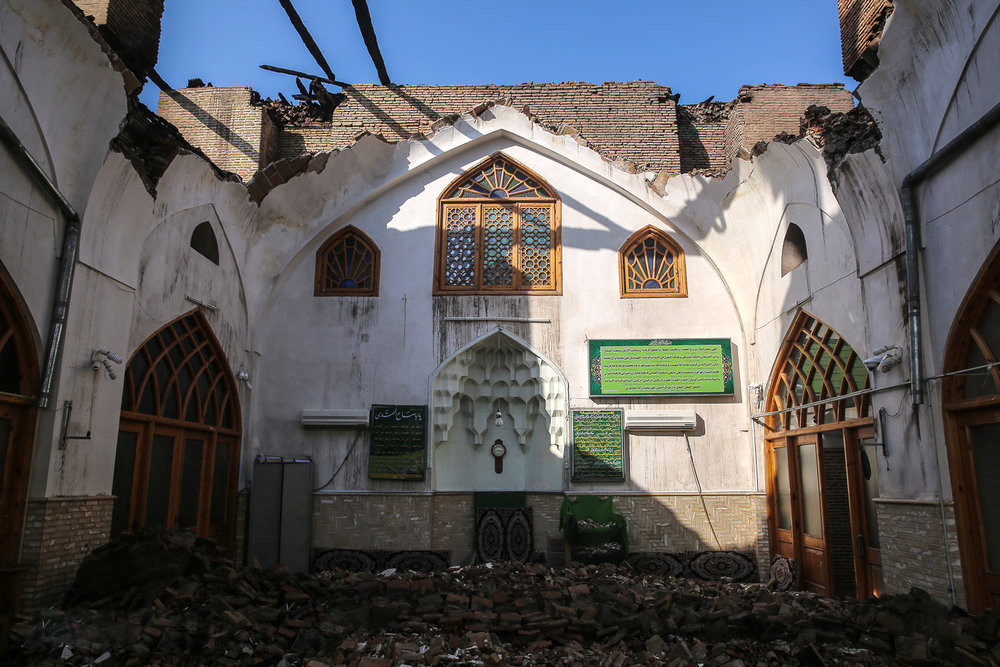
The day after the 2018 fire

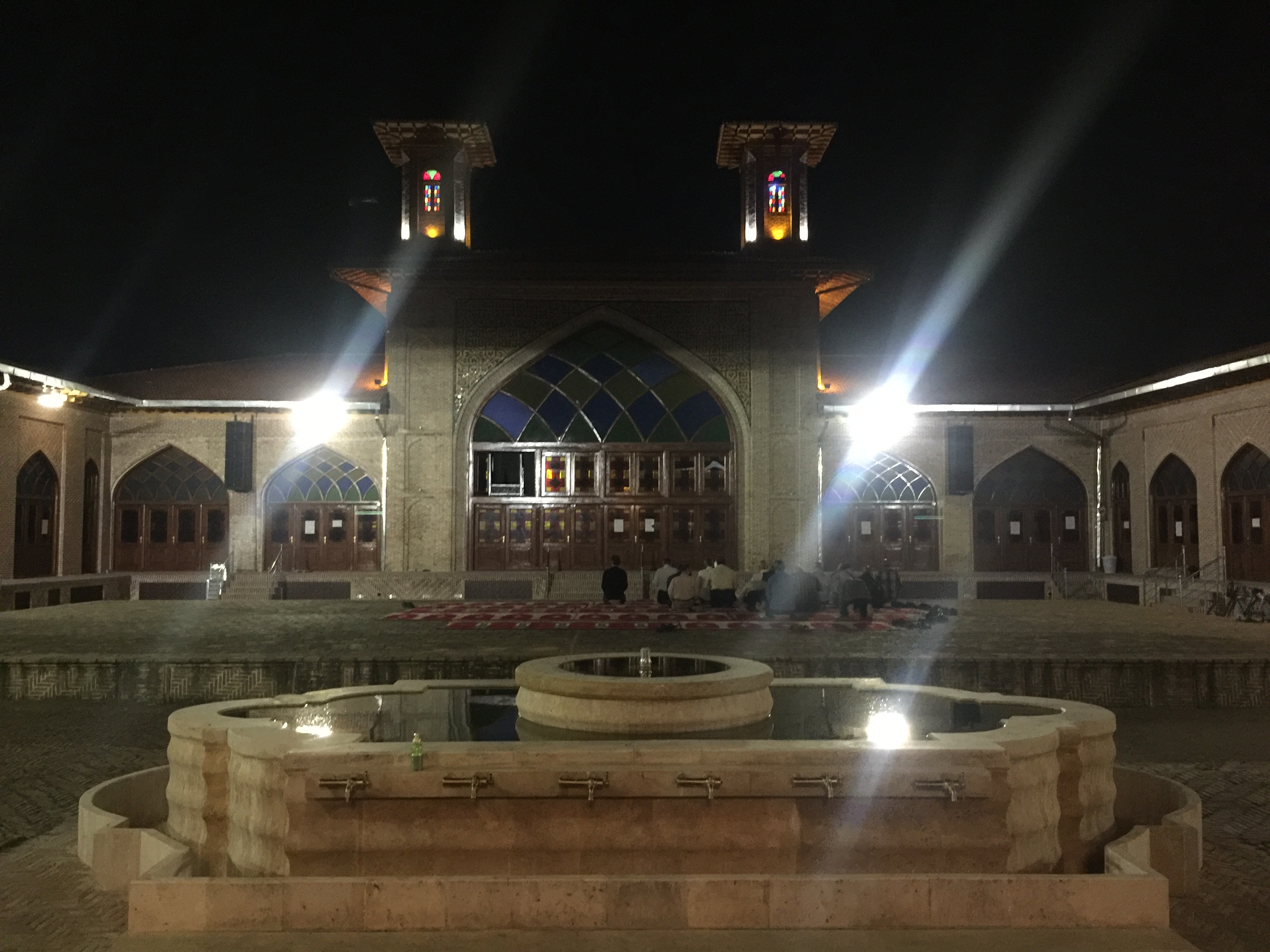
The mosque at night, following the rebuild, in 2020

== See also ==
- Shia Islam in Iran
- List of mosques in Iran
