= Jameh Mosque of Ardakan =

Shi'ite mosque in Ardakan, Yazd province, Iran

Jāmeh Mosque of Ardakan
- مسجد جامع اردکان
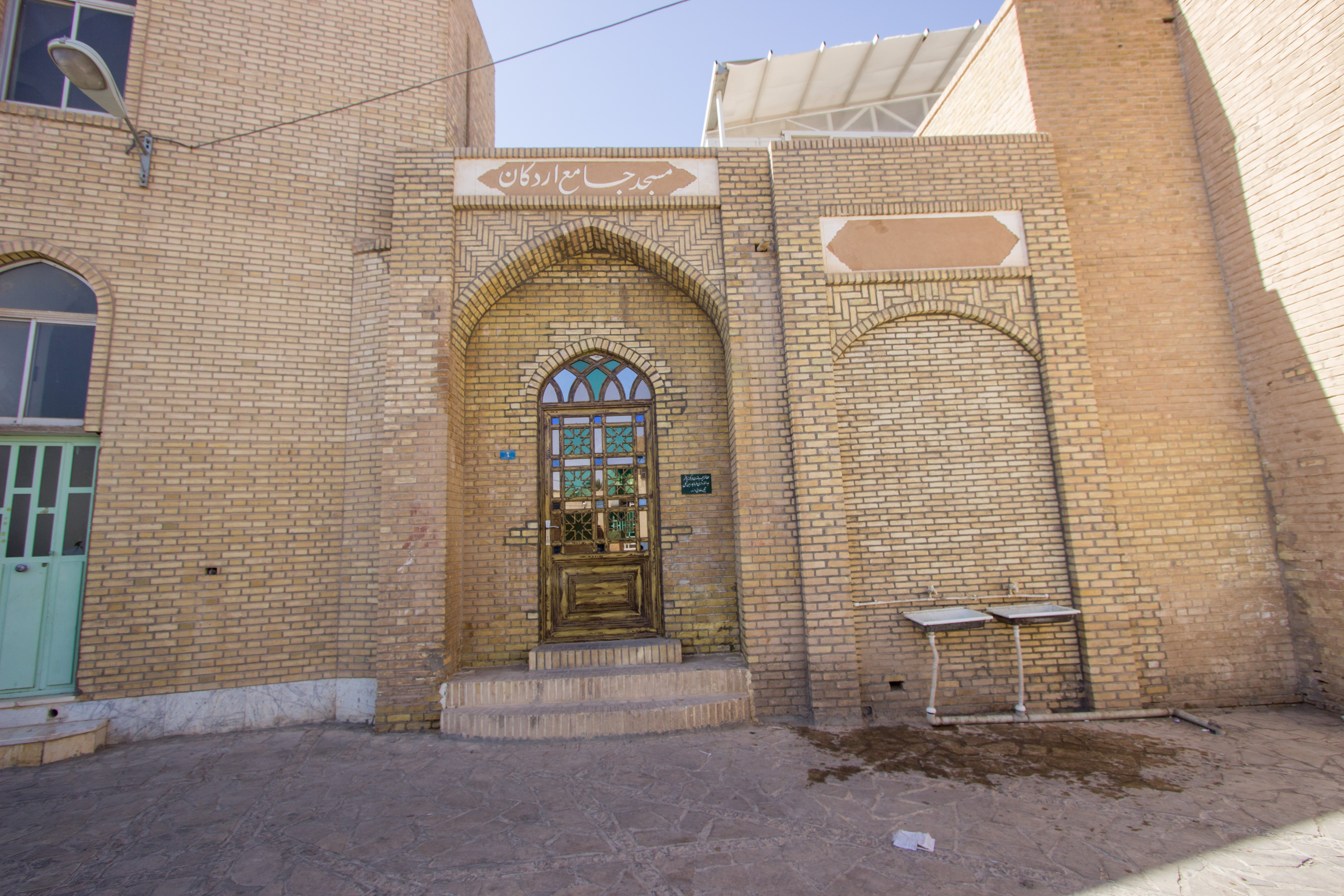
- The mosque in 2017

- Location of the mosque in Iran

Religion
- Affiliation: Shia Islam
- Ecclesiastical or organizational status: Friday mosque
- Status: Active

Location
- Location: Ardakan, Yazd Province
- Country: Iran
- Interactive map of Jāmeh Mosque of Ardakan
- Coordinates: 32°19′09″N 54°01′10″E

Architecture
- Type: Mosque architecture
- Style: Timurid; Safavid
- Completed: 1506 CE

Specifications
- Dome: One (maybe more)
- Materials: Bricks; adobe; mud-brick

Iran National Heritage List
- Official name: Jāmeh Mosque of Ardakan
- Type: Built
- Designated: 22 February 1999
- Reference no.: 2239
- Conservation organization: Cultural Heritage, Handicrafts and Tourism Organization of Iran

The Jāmeh Mosque of Ardakan (Persian: مسجد جامع اردکان; Arabic: جامع أردكان) is a Shi'ite Friday mosque (jāmeh) located next to the public library in Ardakan, in the province of Yazd, Iran. The mosque was completed in 1506 CE, during the Safavid era.

The mosque was added to the Iran National Heritage List on 22 February 1999, administered by the Cultural Heritage, Handicrafts and Tourism Organization of Iran.

== See also ==
- Shia Islam in Iran
- List of mosques in Iran
