= Jameh Mosque of Bastak =

Former mosque in Bastak, Hormozgan, Iran

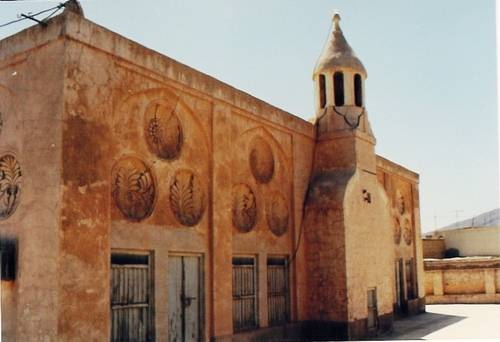
- Ruins of the former mosque

Religion
- Affiliation: Sunni Islam (former)
- Ecclesiastical or organizational status: Mosque (former)
- Status: Abandoned (partial ruinous state)

Location
- Location: Bastak, Hormozgan Province
- Country: Iran

Architecture
- Type: Mosque architecture

The Jameh Mosque of Bastak (Persian: مسجد جامع بستک) is a former mosque, now in a ruinous state, located in Bastak, Hormozgan Province, in Southern Iran.

== History ==
The "Old Bastak Jameh Mosque" is the first mosque built in the city of Bastak. The windcatcher built over the roof of the mosque for the mihrab is another feature of this mosque. The mosque was abandoned and is in a ruinous state.
