= Jameh Mosque of Sojas =

Shi'ite mosque in Sojas, Zanjan province, Iran

Jāmeh Mosque of Sojas
- مسجد جامع سجاس
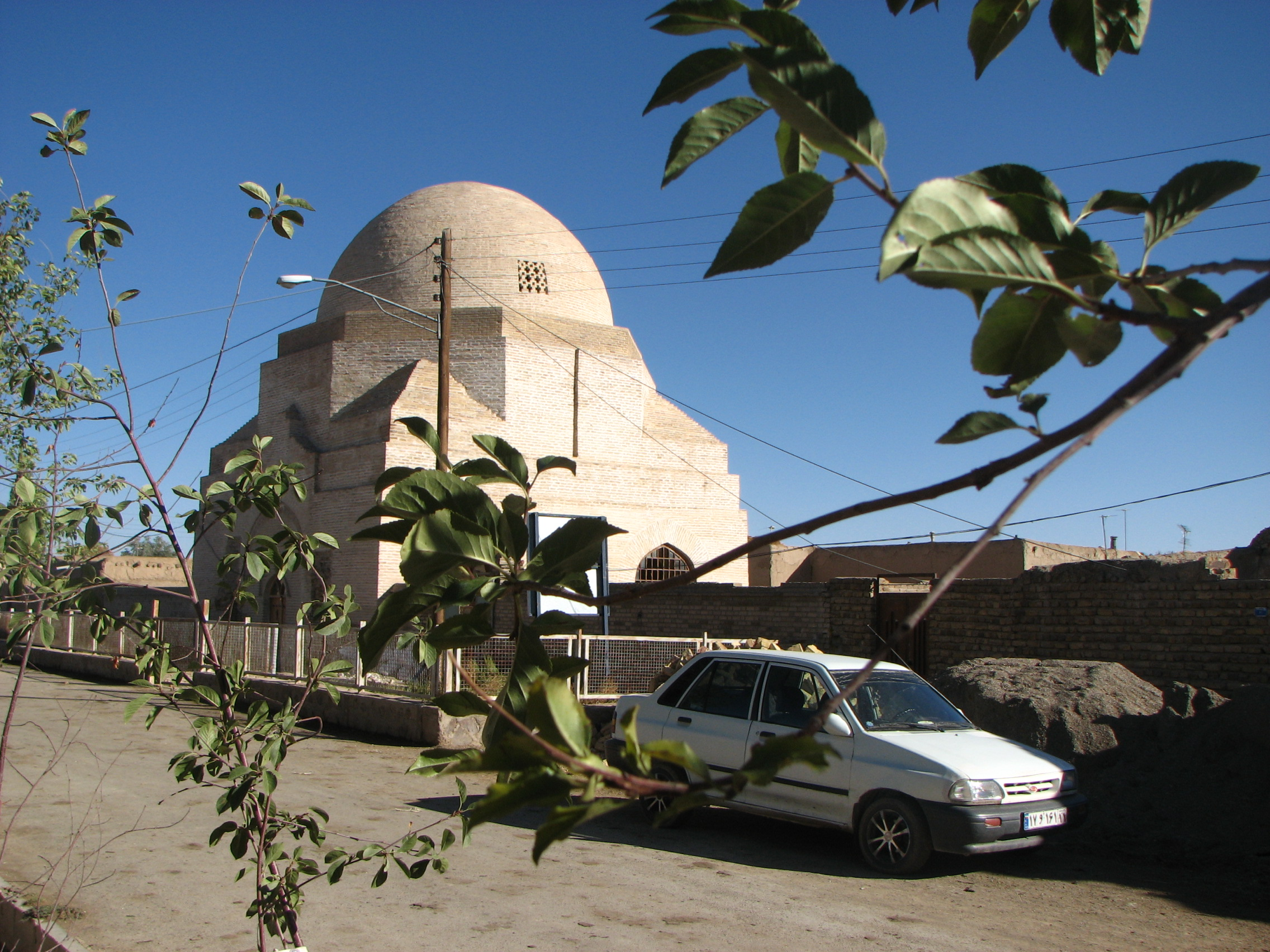
- The mosque and its dome, in 2008

- Location of the mosque in Iran

Religion
- Affiliation: Shia Islam
- Ecclesiastical or organisational status: Friday mosque
- Status: Active

Location
- Location: Sojas, Khodabandeh County, Zanjan Province
- Country: Iran
- Coordinates: 36°14′12″N 48°32′38″E

Architecture
- Type: Mosque architecture
- Style: Seljuk
- Completed: 11th century CE

Specifications
- Length: 11 m (36 ft)
- Width: 11 m (36 ft)
- Dome: One (maybe more)
- Dome height (outer): 14 m (46 ft)
- Materials: Bricks; mortar

Iran National Heritage List
- Official name: Jāmeh Mosque of Sojas
- Type: Built
- Designated: 1 February 1975
- Reference no.: 1019
- Conservation organization: Cultural Heritage, Handicrafts and Tourism Organization of Iran

The Jāmeh Mosque of Sojas (Persian: مسجد جامع سجاس; Arabic: جامع سجاس) is a Shi'ite Friday mosque (jāmeh) located in Sojas, in Khodabandeh County, in the province of Zanjan, Iran. The mosque was completed in the 11th century CE, during the Seljuk era.

The mosque was added to the Iran National Heritage List on 1 February 1975, administered by the Cultural Heritage, Handicrafts and Tourism Organization of Iran.

== See also ==
- Shia Islam in Iran
- List of mosques in Iran
