= Jameh Mosque of Qeshm =

Mosque in Qeshm, Hormozgan, Iran

- مسجدجامع قشم (جزیره قشم)
- Location of the mosque in Iran

Religion
- Affiliation: Sunni Islam
- Ecclesiastical or organizational status: Friday mosque
- Status: Active

Location
- Location: Qeshm, Hormozgan
- Country: Iran
- Interactive map of Jameh Mosque of Qeshm

Architecture
- Type: Mosque architecture
- Style: Safavid
- Completed: 1202 AH (1787/1788 CE)

Specifications
- Domes: One (large); Many (small)
- Minaret: Two

Iran National Heritage List
- Official name: Friday Mosque of Qeshm
- Type: Built
- Conservation organization: Cultural Heritage, Handicrafts and Tourism Organization of Iran

The Jameh Mosque of Qeshm (Persian: مسجدجامع قشم (جزیره قشم), romanized: Masjid-e Jame-ye Gheshm; Arabic: جامع قشم) is a Sunni mosque located in Qeshm, in the province of Hormozgan in southern Iran. Completed during 1202 AH (1787/1788 CE), the Safavid style mosque is a tourist destination of the region.

The mosque was added to the Iran National Heritage List, administered by the Cultural Heritage, Handicrafts and Tourism Organization of Iran.

== See also ==
- Islam in Iran
- List of mosques in Iran
