= Jameh Mosque of Khozan =

Shi'ite mosque in Khomeyni Shahr, Isfahan province, Iran

Jāmeh Mosque of Khozan
- مسجد جامع خوزان
- Location of the mosque in Iran

Religion
- Affiliation: Shia Islam
- Ecclesiastical or organizational status: Friday mosque
- Status: Active

Location
- Location: Khomeyni Shahr, Isfahan province
- Country: Iran
- Interactive map of Jāmeh Mosque of Khozan
- Coordinates: 32°40′59″N 51°32′43″E

Architecture
- Type: Mosque architecture
- Style: Isfahani; Seljuk; Ilkhanid; Safavid; Qajar
- Completed: 15th-century (first structure); 1697 CE

Specifications
- Dome: One
- Materials: Stone; bricks; plaster; tiles; timber; cob

Iran National Heritage List
- Official name: Jāmeh Mosque of Khozan
- Type: Built
- Designated: 16 November 1996
- Reference no.: 1761
- Conservation organization: Cultural Heritage, Handicrafts and Tourism Organization of Iran

The Jāmeh Mosque of Khozan (Persian: مسجد جامع خوزان; Arabic: جامع خوزان) is a Shi'ite Friday mosque (jāmeh), located in Khomeyni Shahr County, in the province of Isfahan, Iran.

The mosque was added to the Iran National Heritage List on 16 November 1996, administered by the Cultural Heritage, Handicrafts and Tourism Organization of Iran.

== Architecture ==
The original building of the mosque dated from the Timurid era in the 15th century, however it's improbable that the current building to be older than the Safavid era. The mosque has four iwans. The southern iwan leads to the inner space of the dome. The inner space of the dome is decorated by muqarnas. The walls of the mosque are covered by stones and bricks. The arches of the northern and southern iwans are decorated with some paintings from the Safavid era, but the paintings of the eastern and western iwans seem to belong to the Qajar era.

The shabestan of the mosque is behind the western iwan. In the shabestan, there are 20 stone columns that are 2 metres (6.6 ft) high. The shabestan had been lit originally with the marble stones of the ceiling, but during the reparations, these marble stones were removed.

== See also ==
- Shia Islam in Iran
- List of mosques in Iran
- List of historical structures in Isfahan province
