= Jameh Mosque of Mehrabad =

Mosque in Bonab, East Azerbaijan, Iran

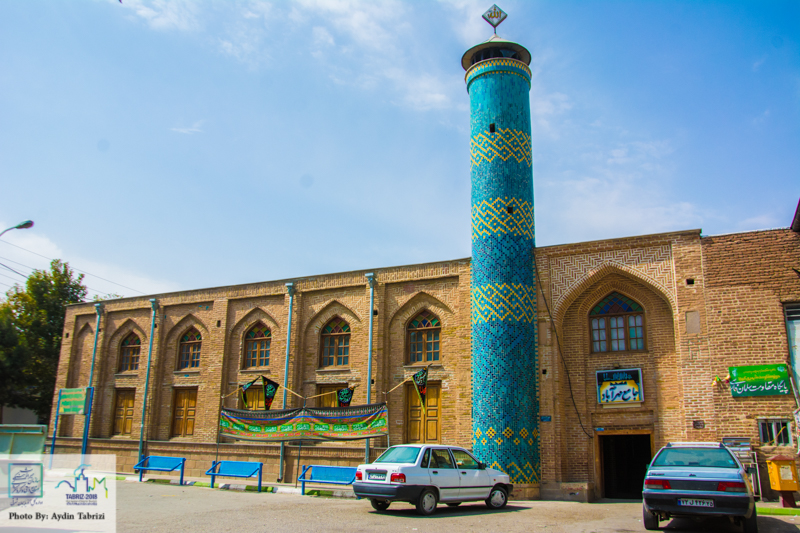
- The mosque with minaret, in 2017

- Location of the mosque in Iran

Religion
- Affiliation: Shia Islam
- Ecclesiastical or organizational status: Friday mosque
- Status: Active

Location
- Location: Bonab, East Azerbaijan
- Country: Iran
- Interactive map of Jameh Mosque of Mehrabad
- Coordinates: 37°20′14″N 46°3′41″E

Architecture
- Type: Mosque architecture
- Style: Safavid
- Completed: Safavid era

Specifications
- Dome: One (maybe more)
- Minaret: One
- Materials: Bricks

Iran National Heritage List
- Official name: Mehrabad Friday Mosque
- Type: Built
- Designated: 1968
- Reference no.: 789
- Conservation organization: Cultural Heritage, Handicrafts and Tourism Organization of Iran

The Jameh Mosque of Mehrabad (Arabic: جامع مهر أباد; Persian: مسجد جامع مهرآباد), also known as the Mehr Abad Jameh Mosque and as the Mihrabad Camii, is a Shi'ite Friday mosque, located in Mehrabad Square, Bonab, in the province of East Azerbaijan, Iran. The mosque was built during the Safavid era. The mosque was constructed in a big square with a porch, seraglio, minaret and sanctuary that are different from most other mosques of the Safavid era.

The mosque was added to the Iran National Heritage List in 1968, administered by the Cultural Heritage, Handicrafts and Tourism Organization of Iran.

== See also ==
- Shia Islam in Iran
- List of mosques in Iran
