= Jameh Mosque of Bandar Abbas =

Main mosque in Bandar Abbas, Hormozgan, Iran

- مسجد جامع بندرعباس
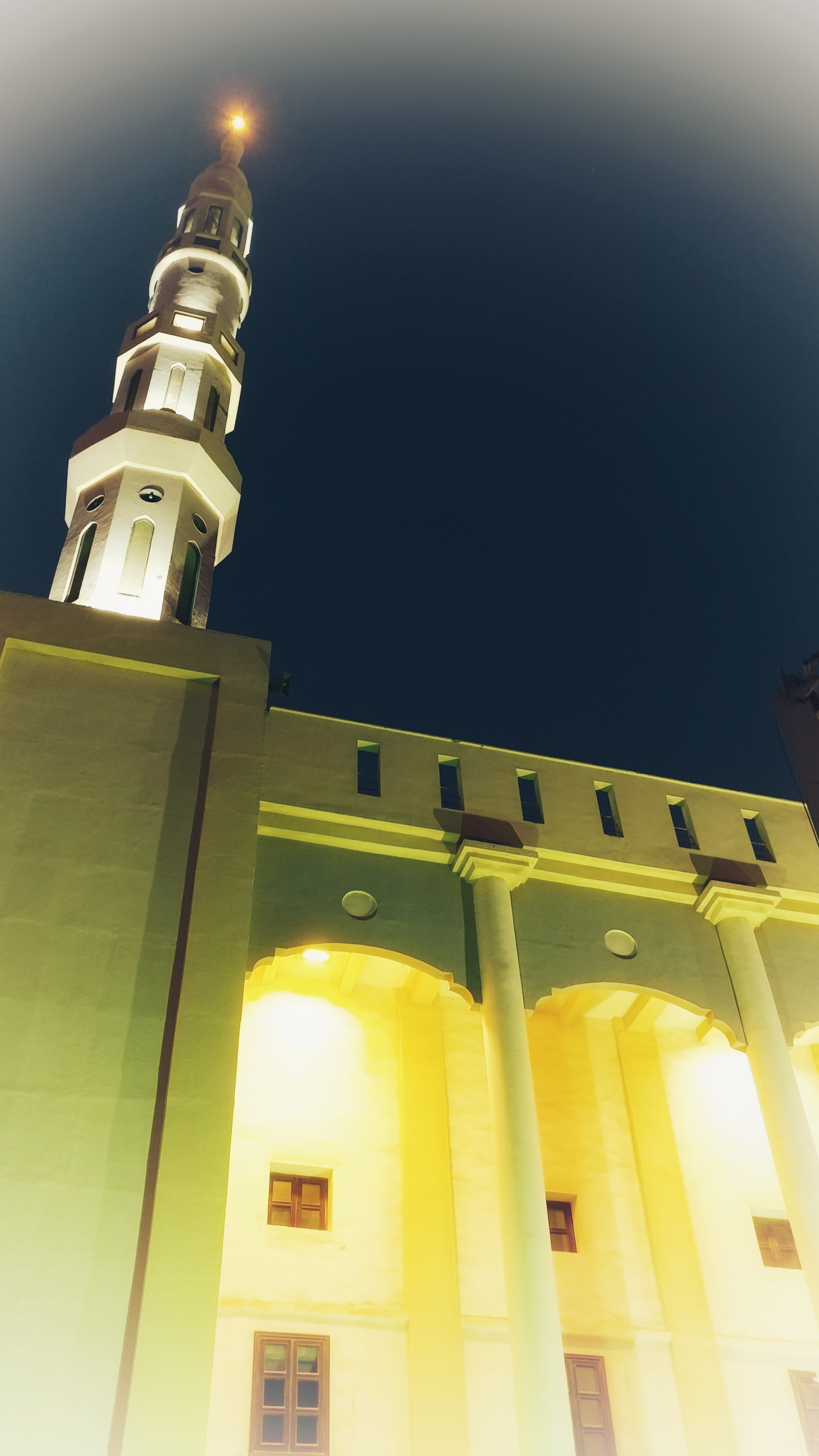
- The mosque at night, in 2017

- Location of the mosque in Iran

Religion
- Affiliation: Sunni Islam
- Ecclesiastical or organizational status: Friday mosque
- Status: Active

Location
- Location: Corner of Telaqani (Saheli) Boulevard and Jameh Mosque of Bandar Abbas Street, Bandar Abbas, Hormozgan
- Country: Iran
- Interactive map of Jameh Mosque of Bandar Abbas
- Coordinates: 27°11′10″N 56°17′39″E

Architecture
- Type: Mosque architecture
- Founder: Zain al-Abidin Abu al-Qasim Ozi
- Completed: 8th century CE; 1975 (reconstruction); 2008 (reconstruction)

Specifications
- Dome: One (maybe more)
- Minaret: One

Iran National Heritage List
- Official name: Friday Mosque of Bandar Abbas
- Type: Built
- Designated: 1978
- Reference no.: 1599
- Conservation organization: Cultural Heritage, Handicrafts and Tourism Organization of Iran

The Jameh Mosque of Bandar Abbas (Persian: مسجد جامع بندرعباس, romanized: masjed Jâme' Bandar-'Abbâs; Arabic: جامع بندر عباس, romanized: jāmiʿ Bandar ʿAbbās), also known as the Jameh Mosque of Delgosha and the Delgosha Jame Mosque, is a Sunni mosque located in Bandar Abbas, the capital of the province of Hormozgan in southern Iran. Completed during the 8th century CE, the mosque is one of the oldest in the region.

The mosque was added to the Iran National Heritage List in 1978, administered by the Cultural Heritage, Handicrafts and Tourism Organization of Iran.

== History ==
The Jameh Mosque of Bandar Abbas, as one of the oldest mosques in the city of Bandar Abbas, and is estimated to have been completed in the 8th century CE. It was built by Hajj Zain al-Abidin Abu al-Qasim Ozi, a great benefactor. The mosque has been renovated and reconstructed several times, over the intervening years.

In 1975, the mosque was completely rebuilt around parts of the original Shabistan. The old mosque had a 12-pillared Shabistan with pillared-iwans on its western, eastern and southern sides. The 12 pillars of the Shabistan are all mounted on cubic pedestals and have stucco relief decorations.

The reconstruction of the Jameh Mosque of Bandar Abbas in the modern era began in 2003 and was completed with the support of Hajj Abdullah Rostamani, a benefactor from the southern region of Iran. After the 5-year reconstruction, the Jameh Mosque of Bandar Abbas was inaugurated on Friday, June 21, 2008, with the presence of Seyed Abdolbaeth Ghotbalee, the Friday Imam of the Sunnis in Bandar Abbas, Ayatollah Gholamali Naeimabad, the Friday Imam of the Shia in Bandar Abbas, the Representative of the Supreme Leader, and the enthusiastic participation of worshippers.

== See also ==
- Islam in Iran
- List of mosques in Iran
