= Jameh Mosque of Takab =

Shi'ite mosque in Takab, West Azerbaijan Province, Iran

Jāmeh Mosque of Takab
- مسجد جامع تکاب
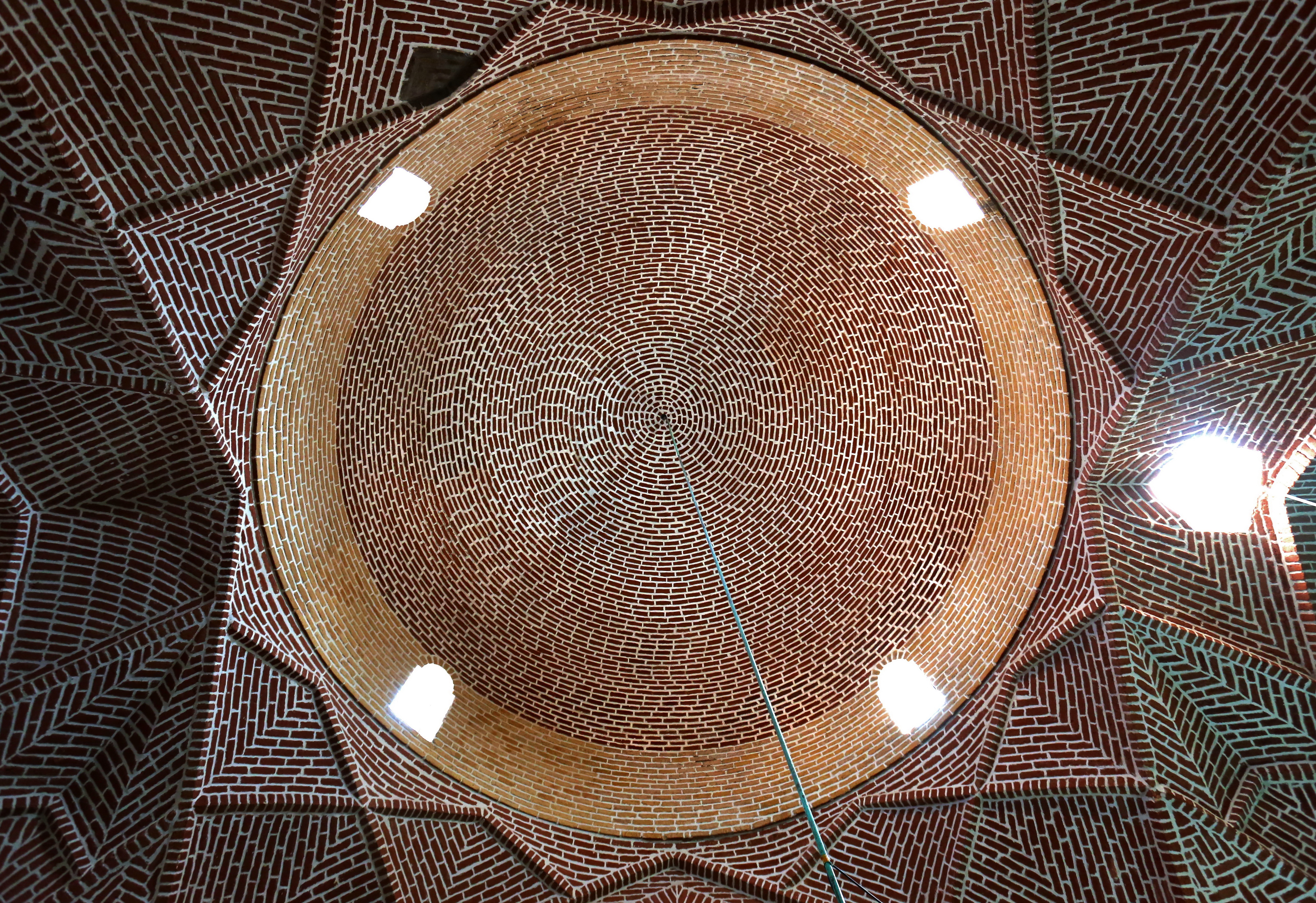
- The mosque dome interior in 2016

- Location of the mosque in Iran

Religion
- Affiliation: Shia Islam
- Ecclesiastical or organizational status: Friday mosque
- Status: Active

Location
- Location: Takab, West Azerbaijan province
- Country: Iran
- Interactive map of Jāmeh Mosque of Takab
- Coordinates: 36°24′4″N 47°6′36″E

Architecture
- Type: Mosque architecture
- Style: Qajar
- Completed: Qajar era

Iran National Heritage List
- Official name: Jameh Mosque of Takab
- Type: Built
- Designated: 31 December 2002
- Reference no.: 6884
- Conservation organization: Cultural Heritage, Handicrafts and Tourism Organization of Iran

The Jāmeh Mosque of Takab (Persian: مسجد جامع تکاب; Arabic: جامع تكاب) is a Shi'ite Friday mosque (jāmeh) located on Imam Khomeini Street in Takab, in the province of West Azerbaijan, Iran. The mosque was completed during the Qajar era.

The mosque was added to the Iran National Heritage List on 31 December 2002, administered by the Cultural Heritage, Handicrafts and Tourism Organization of Iran.

== See also ==
- Shia Islam in Iran
- List of mosques in Iran
