= Great Mosque of Algiers =

Great Mosque of Algiers may refer to:

- Djamaa el Kebir, consecrated 1097
- Djamaa el Djazaïr, inaugurated 2024
