= Jameh Mosque of Damavand =

Mosque in Damavand, Tehran, Iran

Jāmeh Mosque of Damavand
- مسجد جامع دماوند
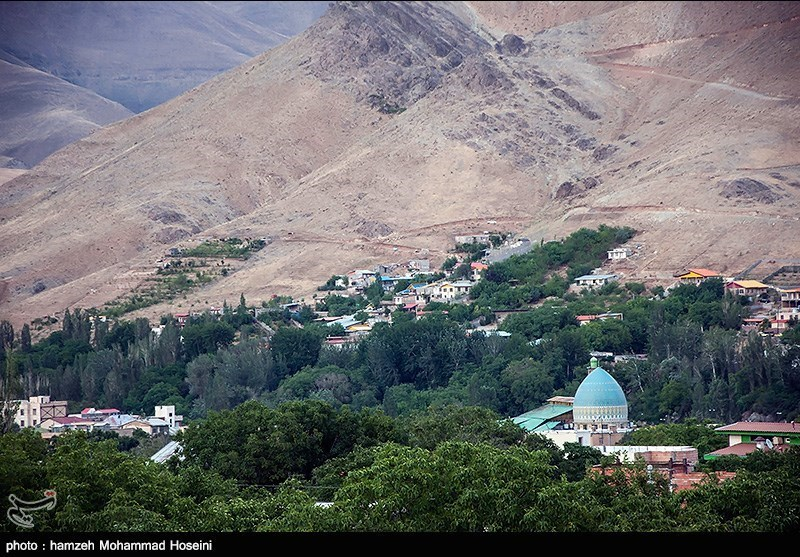
- The mosque in 2005

- Location of the mosque in Iran

Religion
- Affiliation: Shia Islam
- Ecclesiastical or organisational status: Friday mosque
- Status: Active

Location
- Location: Damavand, Tehran Province
- Country: Iran
- Interactive map of Jāmeh Mosque of Damavand
- Coordinates: 35°43′01″N 52°04′12″E

Architecture
- Type: Mosque architecture
- Style: Seljuk
- Completed: Seljuq dynasty

Specifications
- Dome: One
- Minaret: One
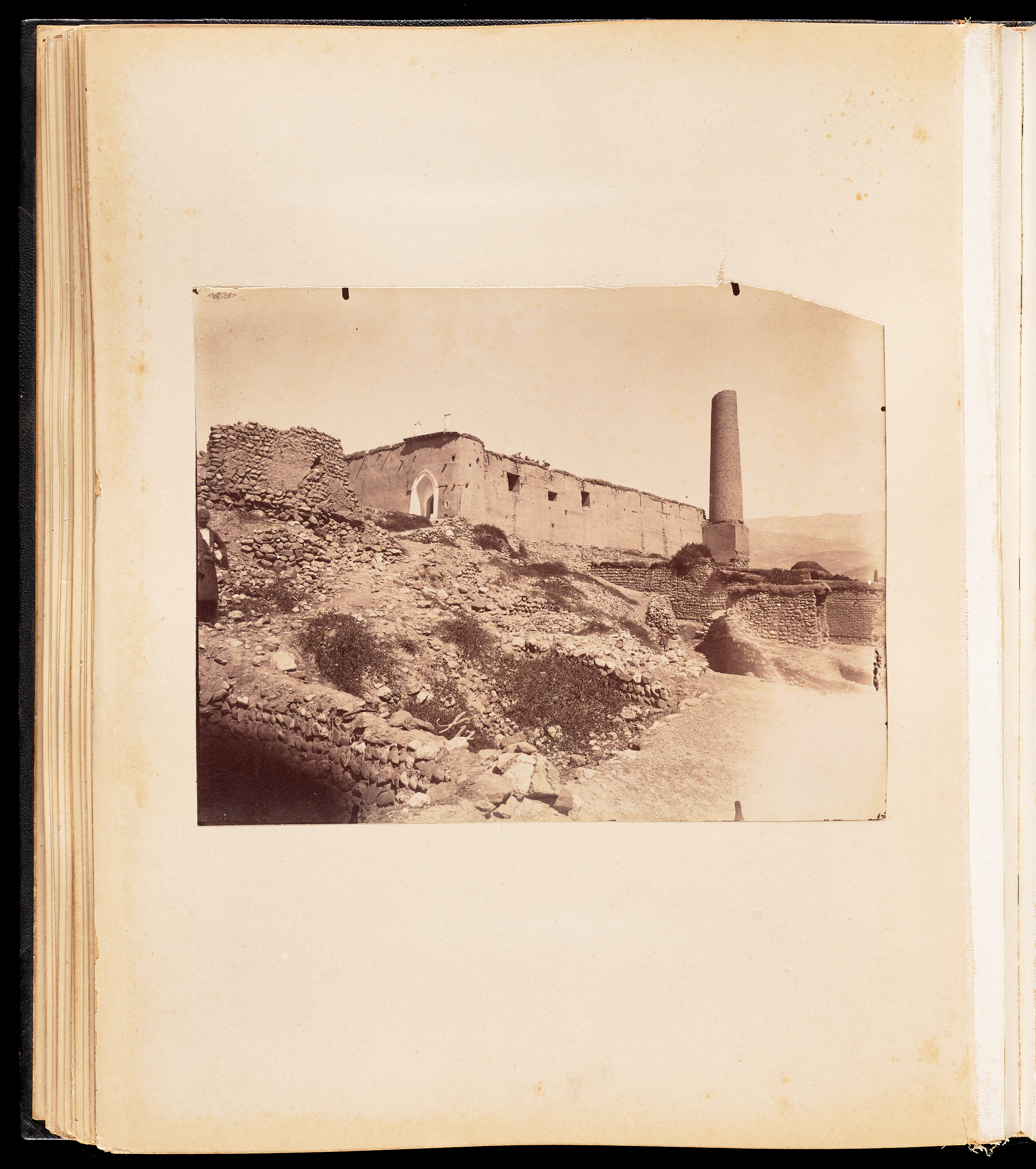
- Image of the mosque in partial ruins, taken by Abdollah Mirza Qajar in c. 1311 AH (1893/1894 CE)

Iran National Heritage List
- Official name: Friday Mosque of Damavand
- Type: Friday Mosque
- Designated: 1934
- Reference no.: 230
- Conservation organization: Cultural Heritage, Handicrafts and Tourism Organization of Iran

The Jāmeh Mosque of Damavand (Persian: مسجد جامع دماوند) is a Friday mosque (jāmeh), located in the city of Damavand, in the province of Tehran, Iran.

Built in the Seljuq era, the mosque includes traces of Sassanid architecture. An inscription with the name Ismail I Safavi can also be seen there. The mosque was added to the Iran National Heritage List on 7 December 1935, administered by the Cultural Heritage, Handicrafts and Tourism Organization of Iran.

== See also ==
- Shia Islam in Iran
- List of mosques in Iran
