= Jaame Masjid, Blackburn =

Mosque in Blackburn, Lancashire, England

Jaame Masjid
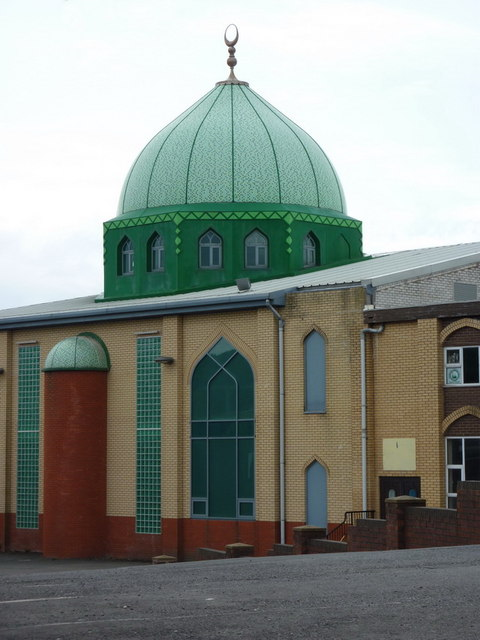
- The mosque in 2011

- Location of the mosque in Lancashire

Religion
- Affiliation: Islam
- Ecclesiastical or organisational status: Mosque
- Status: Active

Location
- Location: Lambert Street, Blackburn, Lancashire, England
- Country: United Kingdom
- Coordinates: 53°44′44″N 2°27′53″W

Architecture
- Type: Mosque architecture
- Completed: 1962

Specifications
- Dome: One
- Minaret: Two

Website
- jaamemasjid.org

The Jaame Masjid, also known as the Jaame Masjid Islamic Cultural Centre, is a mosque, located on Lambert Street in Blackburn, Lancashire, England, in the United Kingdom.

The congregation was established from a house in 1962, incorporating two terrace houses, and has since been expanded on several occasions. It became the first Masjid in Lancashire, recognised as the official central mosque of Blackburn.

== See also ==
- History of Islam in England
- List of mosques in England
