= Jameh Mosque of Sarab =

Mosque in Sarab, East Azerbaijan, Iran

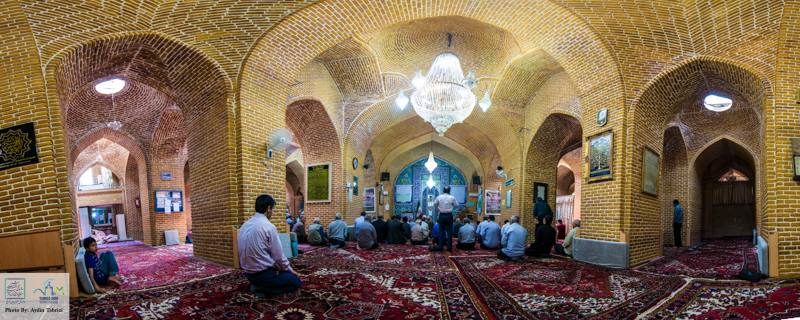
- The mosque interior, in 2018

- Location of the mosque in Iran

Religion
- Affiliation: Shia Islam
- Ecclesiastical or organizational status: Mosque
- Status: Active

Location
- Location: Imam Khomeini Street, Sarab, East Azerbaijan Province
- Country: Iran
- Interactive map of Jameh Mosque of Sarab
- Coordinates: 37°56′18″N 47°32′09″E

Architecture
- Type: Mosque architecture
- Style: Timurid
- Founder: Haji Rafiuddin ibn Alhaji Moshiruddin
- Completed: 875 AH (1470/1471 CE)

Specifications
- Dome: Sixty
- Materials: Bricks; tiles

Iran National Heritage List
- Official name: Sarab Friday Mosque
- Type: Archaeological
- Designated: 1968
- Reference no.: 797
- Conservation organization: Cultural Heritage, Handicrafts and Tourism Organization of Iran

The Jameh Mosque of Sarab (Persian: مسجد جامع سراب; Arabic: جامع سراب), also known as the Jame’ Mosque of Sarab, is a Shi'ite Friday mosque, located in Sarab, in the province of East Azerbaijan, Iran. The mosque was completed in 875 AH (1470/1471 CE).

== History ==
An inscription at the eastern entrance of the mosque, written in the Naskh script, dates the mosque as completed in 875 AH (1470/1471 CE), during the Mughal era and the Aq Qoyunlu Sunni dynasty. The inscription was installed during the reign of Abu Nasr Uzun Hasan Aq Quyunlu. Excavations on the mosque site have revealed that the current mosque was built on the remains of an older mosque. The name “Haji Rafiuddin ibn Alhaji Moshiruddin”, the founder of the mosque, is engraved on the inscription.

== Architecture ==
The mosque does not have a minaret. The mosque has a large nave and a small courtyard, with two entrances. There are no special decorations inside the mosque and only three niches are located on the southern wall, of which two niches have simple plaster decorations and one is decorated with Zarrinfam glazed tiles. The tiled niche is 142 centimetres (56 in) high and 152 centimetres (60 in) wide. A one-piece tile with Arabesque motifs and turquoise colour glaze can be seen inside this niche. There is a 30 centimetres (12 in) wide inscription made of embossed tiles in this niche most of which is damaged. The existing nave of the mosque has a series of sixty domes, most of which are built on a vault and columns. The mosque has a wooden minbar that is 2.1 metres (6 ft 11 in) high and 3.6 metres (12 ft) long and has seven high steps. The donor's name is written on the minbar in Thuluth script.

The mosque was added to the Iran National Heritage List in 1968, administered by the Cultural Heritage, Handicrafts and Tourism Organization of Iran.

== See also ==
- Shia Islam in Iran
- List of mosques in Iran
