= Jameh Mosque of Aradan =

Mosque in Aradan, Semnan province, Iran

Jāmeh Mosque of Aradan
- مسجد جامع و حسینیه آرادان
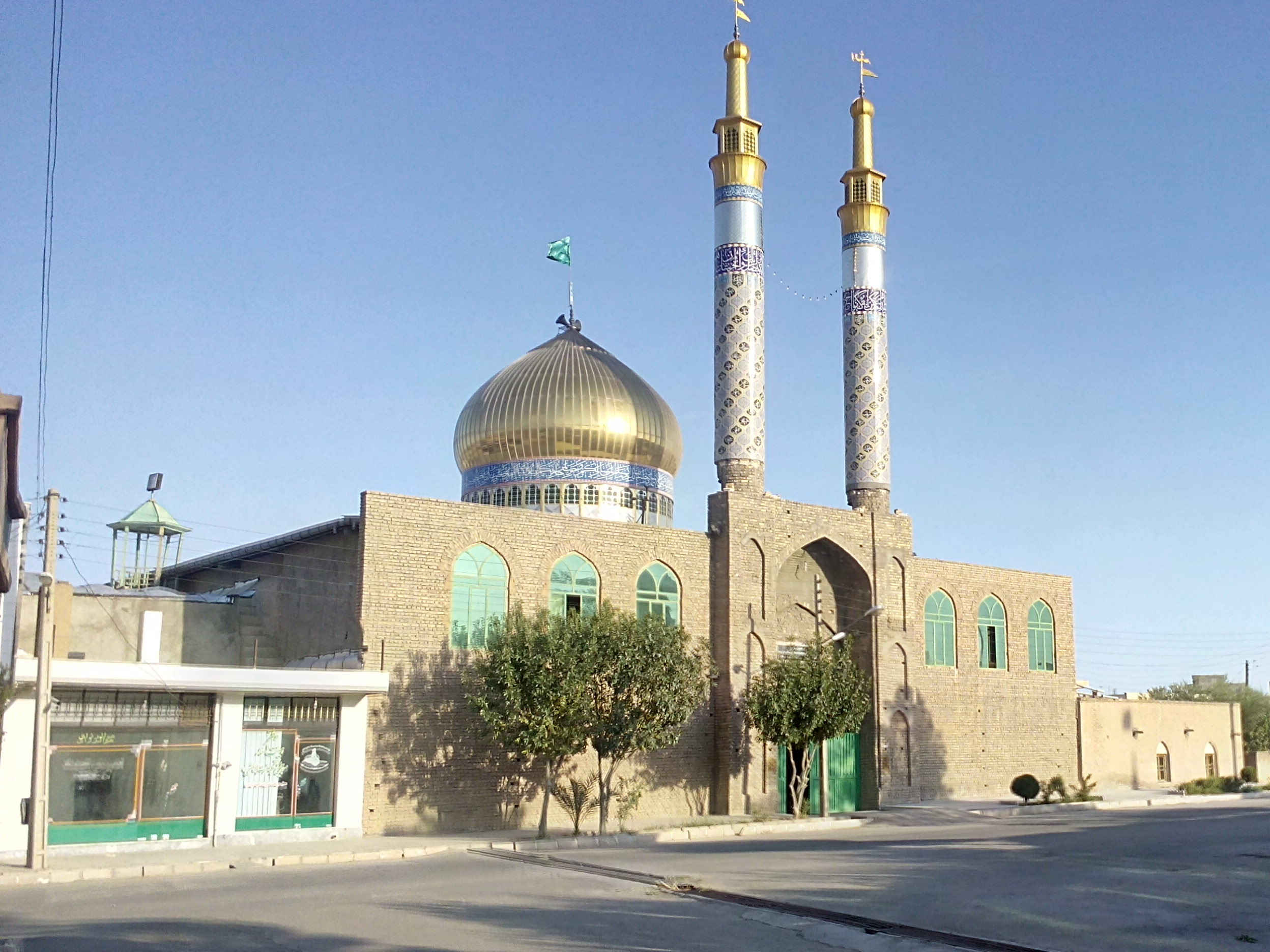
- The mosque entrance in 2015

- Location of the mosque in Iran

Religion
- Affiliation: Shia Islam
- Ecclesiastical or organizational status: Friday mosque and Hussainiya
- Status: Active

Location
- Location: Aradan, Semnan Province
- Country: Iran
- Interactive map of Jāmeh Mosque of Aradan
- Coordinates: 35°15′5.5″N 52°29′45″E

Architecture
- Type: Mosque architecture
- Style: Qajar
- Completed: Qajar

Specifications
- Dome: One (maybe more)
- Minaret: Two
- Materials: Bricks; adobe; mud bricks; plaster

Iran National Heritage List
- Official name: Jāmeh Mosque of Aradan
- Type: Built
- Designated: 16 March 2002
- Reference no.: 5648
- Conservation organization: Cultural Heritage, Handicrafts and Tourism Organization of Iran

The Jāmeh Mosque of Aradan (Persian: مسجد جامع و حسینیه آرادان; Arabic: جامع آرادان) is a Shi'ite Friday mosque (jāmeh) and Hussainiya, located in Aradan, in the province of Semnan, Iran. Completed during the Qajar era, the mosque is located adjacent to the Imamzadeh Shah.

The mosque was added to the Iran National Heritage List on 16 March 2002, administered by the Cultural Heritage, Handicrafts and Tourism Organization of Iran.

== Gallery ==
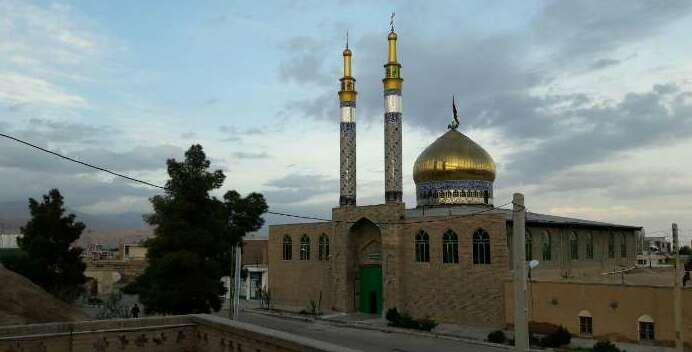
The mosque in 2017

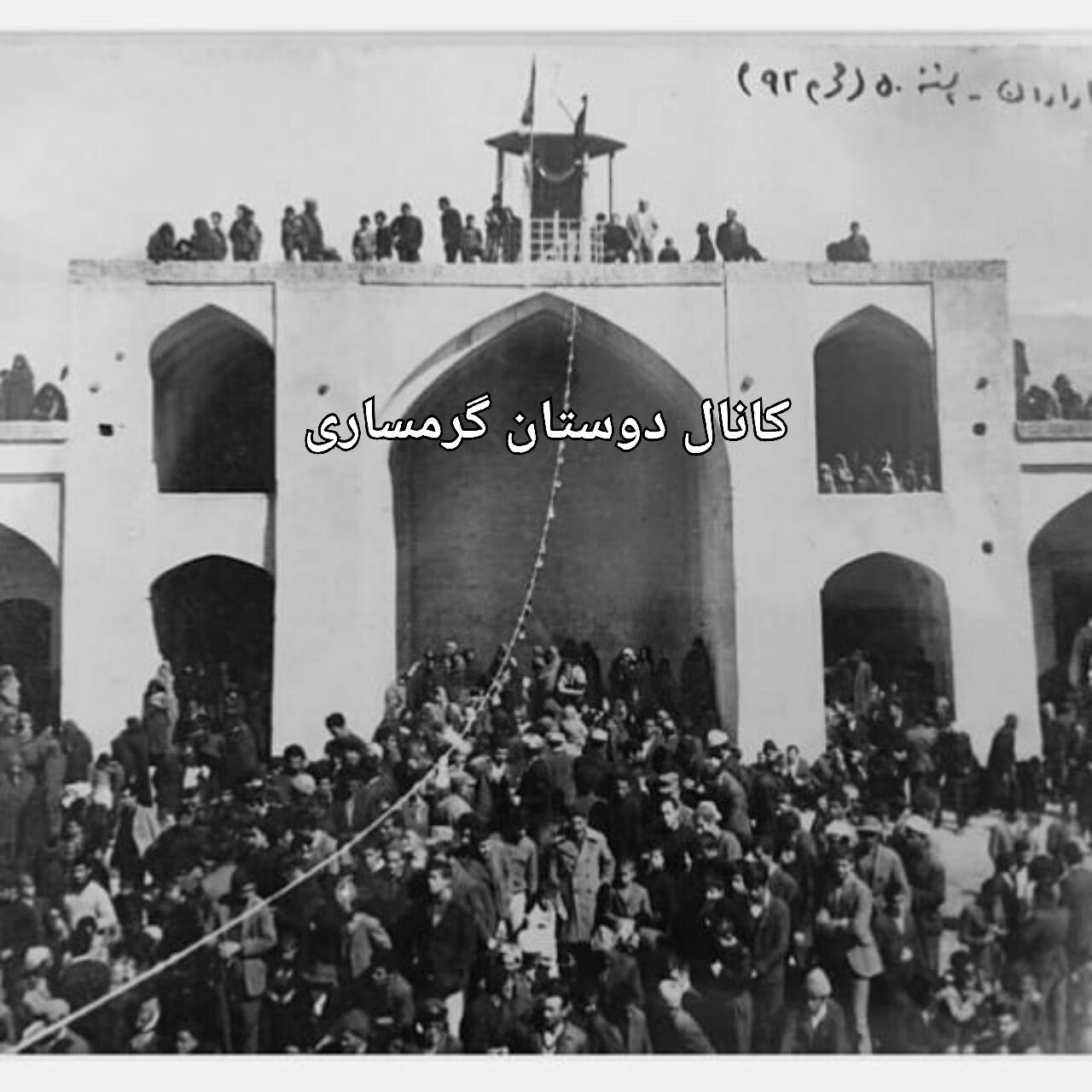
Worshippers in front of the mosque, undated

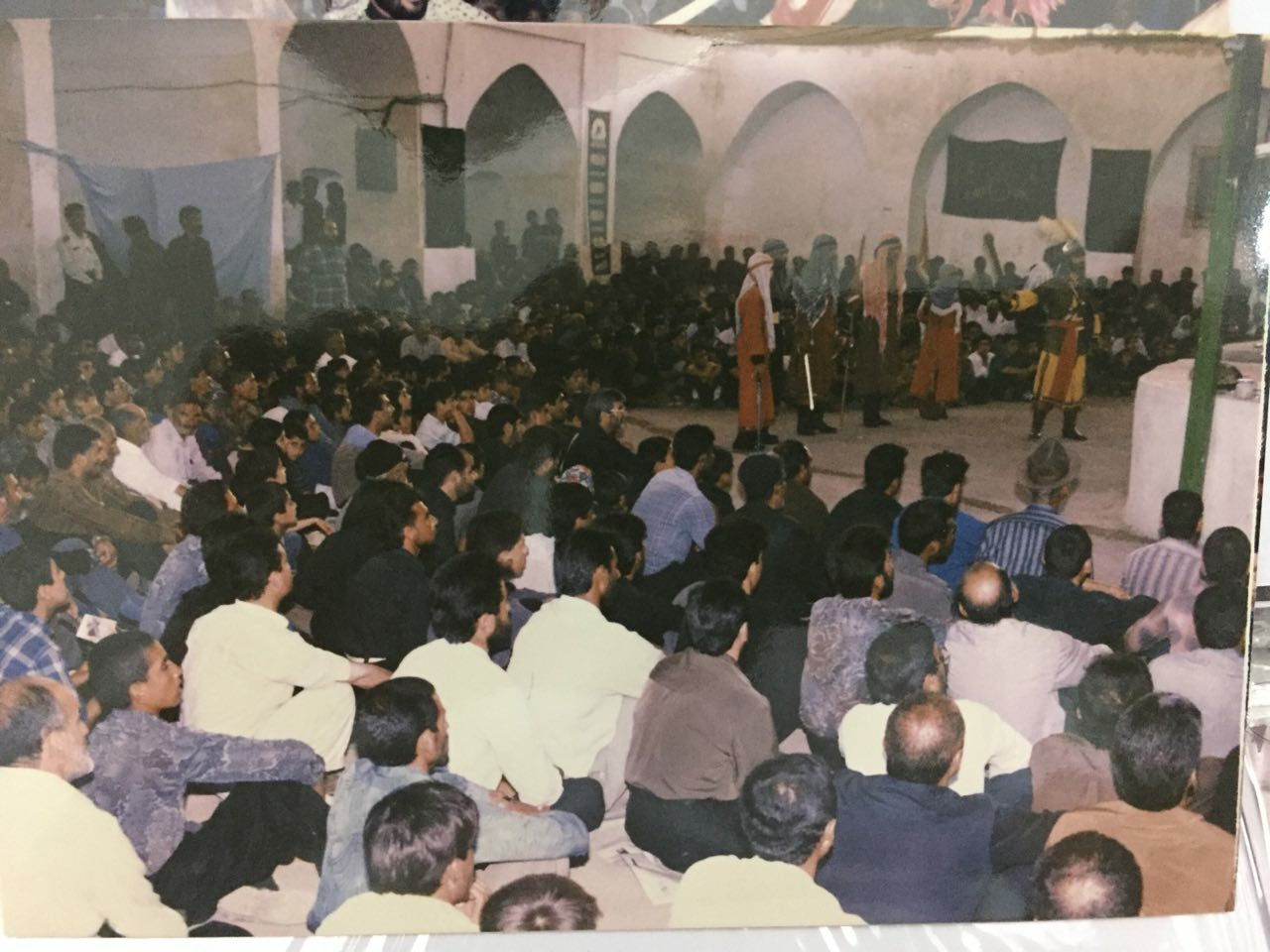
Worshippers inside the mosque, undated

== See also ==
- Shia Islam in Iran
- List of mosques in Iran
