= Great Mosque of Malang =

Mosque in Malang, East Java, Indonesia

Great Mosque of Malang Masjid Agung Malang
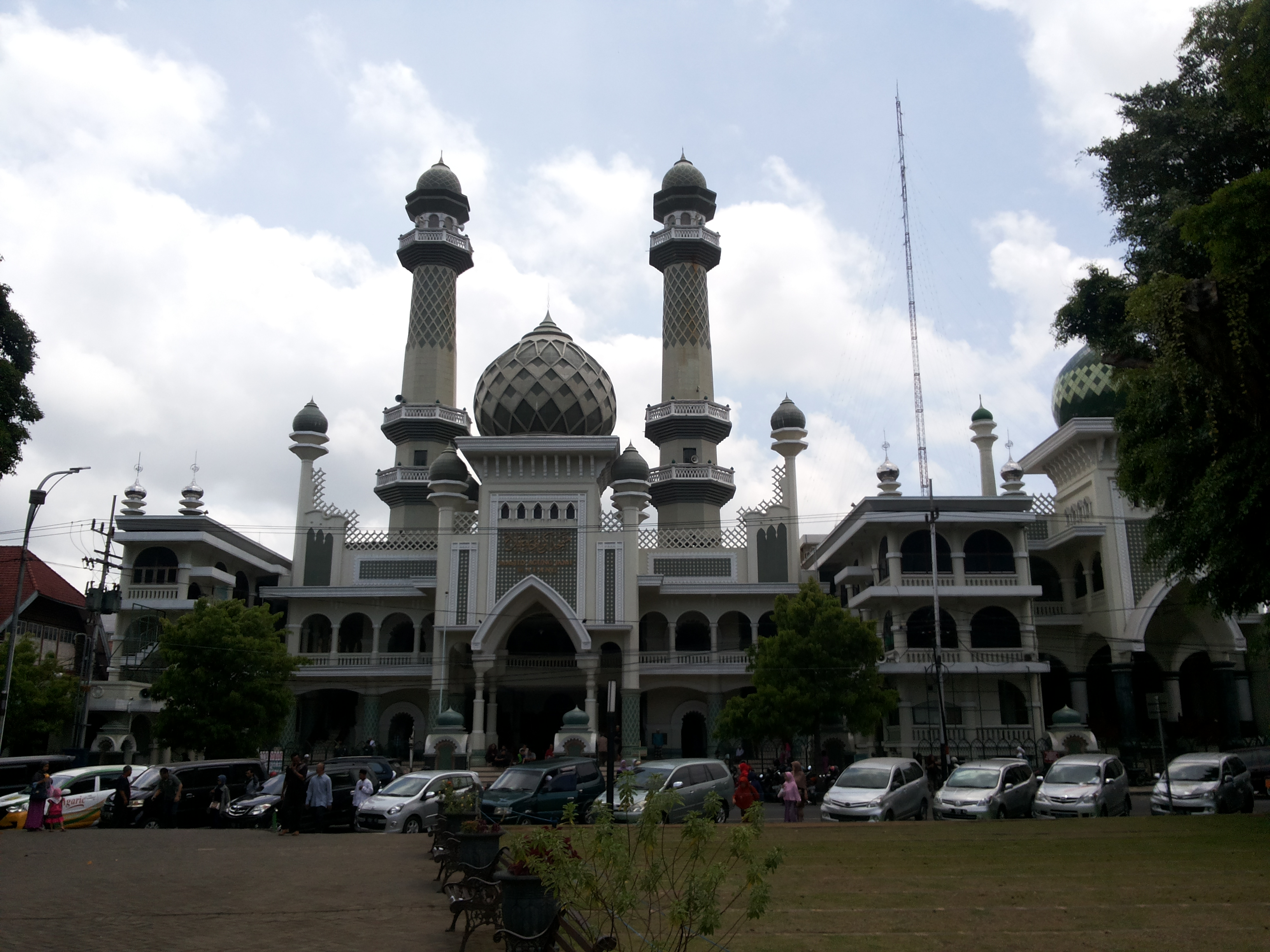

Religion
- Affiliation: Islam
- Branch/tradition: Sunni

Location
- Location: Malang, East Java, Indonesia
- Interactive map of Great Mosque of Malang; Masjid Agung Malang
- Coordinates: 7.9823846000000005°S 112.62964579999999°E

Architecture
- Type: Mosque
- Style: Javanese, Arabic
- Groundbreaking: 1890
- Completed: 1903

The Great Mosque of Malang is a mosque located in Malang, East Java, Indonesia. The mosque was built in 1890 and completed in 1903. The mosque is square-shaped, constructed with steel, and has a tajug (pyramid shaped rooftop ornament) on top. The original building is still maintained today.

== History ==
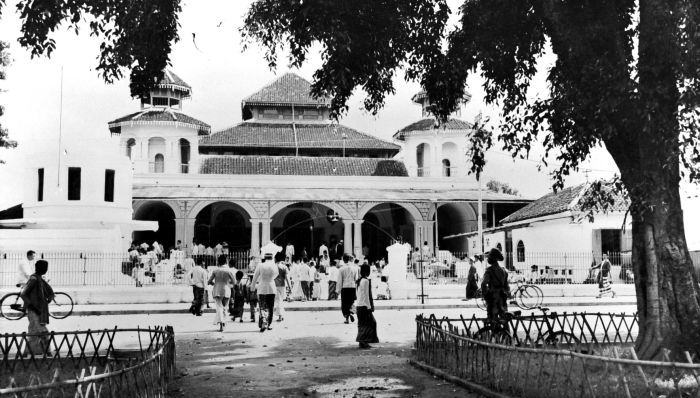
The Great Mosque of Malang in 1910.

The Great Mosque of Malang was established in 1890 on the land of the Goepernemen or state owned land of around 3,000 square meters. According to the existing inscriptions, the mosque was built in two stages. The first stage began in 1890, then the second stage began on 15 March 1903, and was completed on 13 September 1903. The building is a square-shaped steel structure with tajug roof on top, and although until now the original building is still maintained, the serambi (front porch) of the building was heavily altered, concealing the original architecture of the mosque just behind it.

== Architectural style ==
From its shape, the Great Mosque of Malang contains two architectural styles, namely Javanese architecture and Arabic architecture. Javanese architectural style is seen from the roof of the old part of the mosque in the form of tajug. While Arabic architectural style is seen from the dome form on the minarets of the mosque and also the construction of entrance arches in the front yard and window openings. The building is supported by four main pillars made of teak wood and shape of the other 20 columns are made similarly to the four main pillars, built with full tirakat and keihlasan prayers for maximum religious benefits.
