= Jameh Mosque of Lar =

Mosque in Fars, Iran

- مسجد جامع لار
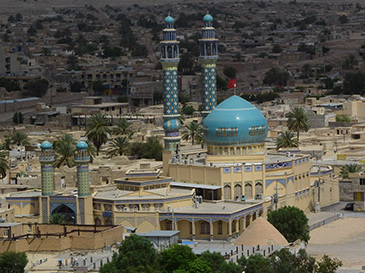
- An aerial view of the mosque in 2015

- Location of the mosque in Iran

Religion
- Affiliation: Islam
- Ecclesiastical or organizational status: Friday mosque
- Status: Active

Location
- Location: Old City of Lar, Larestan County, Fars
- Country: Iran
- Interactive map of Jameh Mosque of Lar
- Coordinates: 27°41′08″N 54°20′19″E

Architecture
- Type: Mosque architecture
- Style: Safavid
- Completed: 1317 CE (initial structure); 1619 (renovation); 2003 (renovation)

Specifications
- Dome: One
- Minaret: Two

The Jameh Mosque of Lar (Persian: مسجد جامع لار; Arabic: جامع لار) is a Friday mosque, located in the old city of Lar, also known as Shahr-e Qadim, in Larestan County, in the south of the province of Fars, Iran. The mosque was built in 1317 CE, during the Ilkhanid and Safavid eras. The mosque is situated in the Ardfurushan neighborhood, on northern Modarres Street, old city of Lar.

The main part of the mosque include four arches, built by a stonemason, and it had an altar which was destroyed at the time of its renovation.

== See also ==
- Islam in Iran
- List of mosques in Iran
