= Manonjaya Great Mosque =

Mosque in Tasikmalaya, West Java, Indonesia

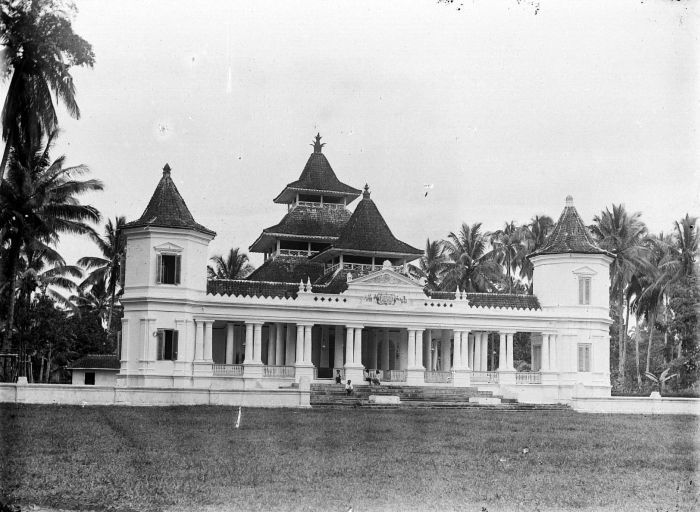
- Manonjaya Great Mosque, circa 1890

Religion
- Affiliation: Islam
- Branch/tradition: Sunni

Location
- Location: Manonjaya, Tasikmalaya Regency, West Java
- Interactive map of Manonjaya Great Mosque
- Coordinates: 7.3513°S 108.3072°E

Architecture
- Type: Mosque
- Style: Islamic architecture, Neoclassical architecture
- Completed: 1832

Specifications
- Dome: 0
- Minaret: 4

Manonjaya Great Mosque is one of the oldest mosques in Tasikmalaya Regency, Indonesia. It was completed in 1837 with an area of 1250 square meters. Together with the Great Mosque of Sumedang, the government established the mosque as a paramount cultural heritage of Islam in 1975. The government's decree was issued by the Archaeology Board of Indonesia, which referred to the Antiquities Law on 1 September 1975.

== History ==
The existence of the mosque is inseparable from the history of Tasikmalaya. More than a hundred years ago, Manonjaya used to be the municipality of Tasikmalaya, and referred as Sukapura. Manonjaya Grand Mosque was built around 1832 when the Regent of Sukapura was led by the local ruler Wiradadaha VIII. The construction of the mosque was carried out simultaneously with the transfer of the district capital from Pasirpanjang (now Sukaraja) to Manonjaya (then still called Harjawinangun).

== Destruction and restoration ==
The 2009 West Java earthquake destroyed the mosque. It has also been damaged during the 1977 earthquake, and was subsequently repaired. However, 60 pillars often referred to as Dalem Sewidak could not withstand the magnitude of the 2009 earthquake. The front of the mosque collapsed instantly, and logs buffering the roof were scattered. There were no casualties reported within the mosque area. As of 2012, the restoration of the mosque has been completed.
