= Jameh Mosque of Eslamiyeh =

Shi'ite mosque and shrine in Eslamiyeh, Yazd province, Iran

Jāmeh Mosque of Eslamiyeh
- مسجد جامع اسلامیه
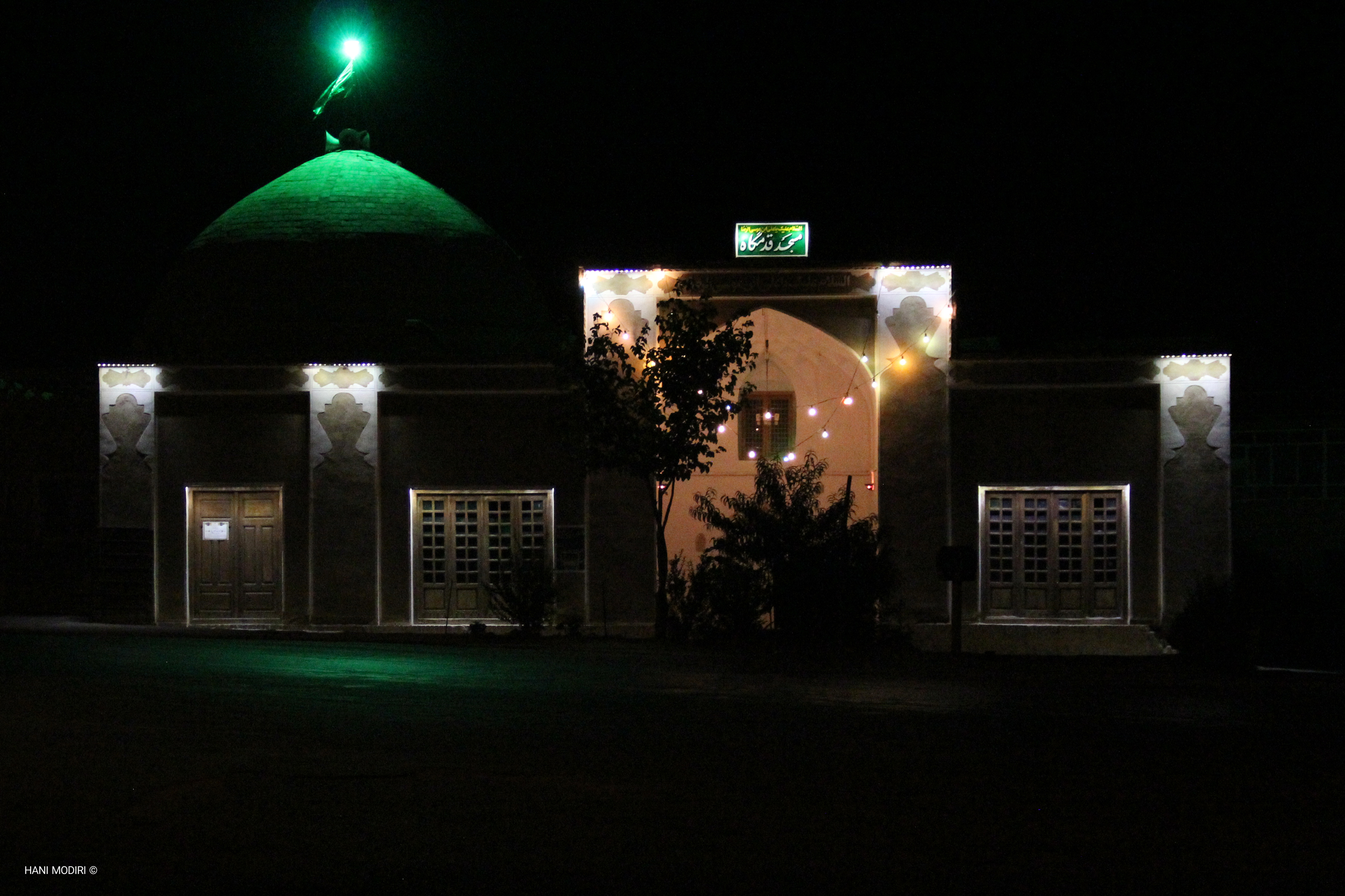
- The mosque at night in 2015

- Location of the mosque in Iran

Religion
- Affiliation: Shia Islam
- Ecclesiastical or organizational status: Friday mosque and shrine
- Status: Active

Location
- Location: Eslamiyeh, Taft County, Yazd Province
- Country: Iran
- Interactive map of Jāmeh Mosque of Eslamiyeh
- Coordinates: 31°43′42″N 54°06′20″E

Architecture
- Type: Mosque architecture
- Style: Buyid (shrine); Qajar (mosque)
- Completed: 1118 CE (shrine); c.18th century; Qajar era (mosque)

Specifications
- Dome: One (maybe more)
- Shrine: One:
- Materials: Bricks; adobe; plaster; timber

Iran National Heritage List
- Official name: Farashah Shrine
- Type: Built
- Designated: 6 September 1975
- Reference no.: 1094
- Conservation organization: Cultural Heritage, Handicrafts and Tourism Organization of Iran

Iran National Heritage List
- Official name: Jāmeh Mosque of Eslamiyeh
- Type: Built
- Designated: 13 November 2007
- Reference no.: 19892
- Conservation organization: Cultural Heritage, Handicrafts and Tourism Organization of Iran

The Jāmeh Mosque of Eslamiyeh (Persian: مسجد جامع اسلامیه; Arabic: جامع إسلامية), also known as the Farashah Shrine (Persian: قدمگاه فراشاه), (Note: The shrine is also variously known as the Qadamgah-e Farashah, the Farashah Qadamgah, the Imam Reza Shrine (Eslamiyeh), the Imam Reza Qadamgah, the Eslamiyeh Qadamgah, and the Qadamgah-e Eslamiyeh.) is a Shi'ite Friday mosque (jāmeh) and shrine located on the historical axis of Eslamiyeh, in Taft County, in the province of Yazd, Iran.

The shrine was established in 1118 CE, during the Buyid era, and the mosque was completed in c.18th century, during the Qajar era.

The shrine was added to the Iran National Heritage List on 6 September 1975 and the mosque was added to the same list on 13 November 2007, both administered by the Cultural Heritage, Handicrafts and Tourism Organization of Iran.

== See also ==
- Shia Islam in Iran
- List of mosques in Iran
