= Jameh Mosque of Marand =

Mosque in Marand, East Azerbaijan, Iran

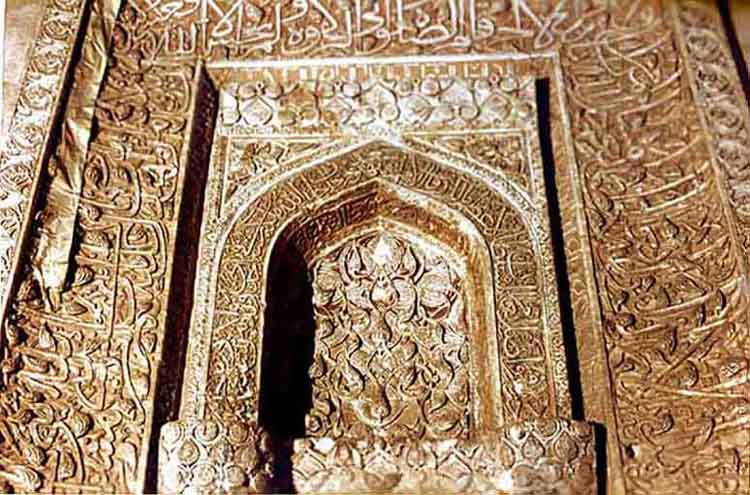
- Mihrab of the mosque, in 2014

- Location of the mosque in Iran

Religion
- Affiliation: Shia Islam
- Ecclesiastical or organisational status: Friday mosque
- Status: Active

Location
- Location: Marand, East Azerbaijan
- Country: Iran
- Coordinates: 38°25′52″N 45°46′32″E

Architecture
- Type: Mosque architecture
- Style: Ilkhanate
- Completed: 731 AH (1330/1331 CE)
- Dome: One (maybe more)
- Inscriptions: Many, on the mihrab

Iran National Heritage List
- Official name: Friday Mosque of Marand
- Type: Friday Mosque
- Designated: 1932
- Reference no.: 139
- Conservation organization: Cultural Heritage, Handicrafts and Tourism Organization of Iran

The Jameh Mosque of Marand (Persian: مسجد جامع مرند) is a Shi'ite Friday mosque, located in Marand, in the province of East Azerbaijan, Iran. The mosque was built in 731 AH (1330/1331 CE) during the reign of Abu Sa'id Bahadur Khan, according to the mihrab of the mosque.

The mihrab is located in the southern part of the mosque and is filled with Quran Āyah and Kufic stucco.

The mosque was added to the Iran National Heritage List in 1932, administered by the Cultural Heritage, Handicrafts and Tourism Organization of Iran.

== See also ==
- Shia Islam in Iran
- List of mosques in Iran
