= Great Mosque of Riyadusshalihin =

Mosque in Hulu Sungai Tengah, South Kalimantan, Indonesia

- Masjid Agung Riadhussalihin
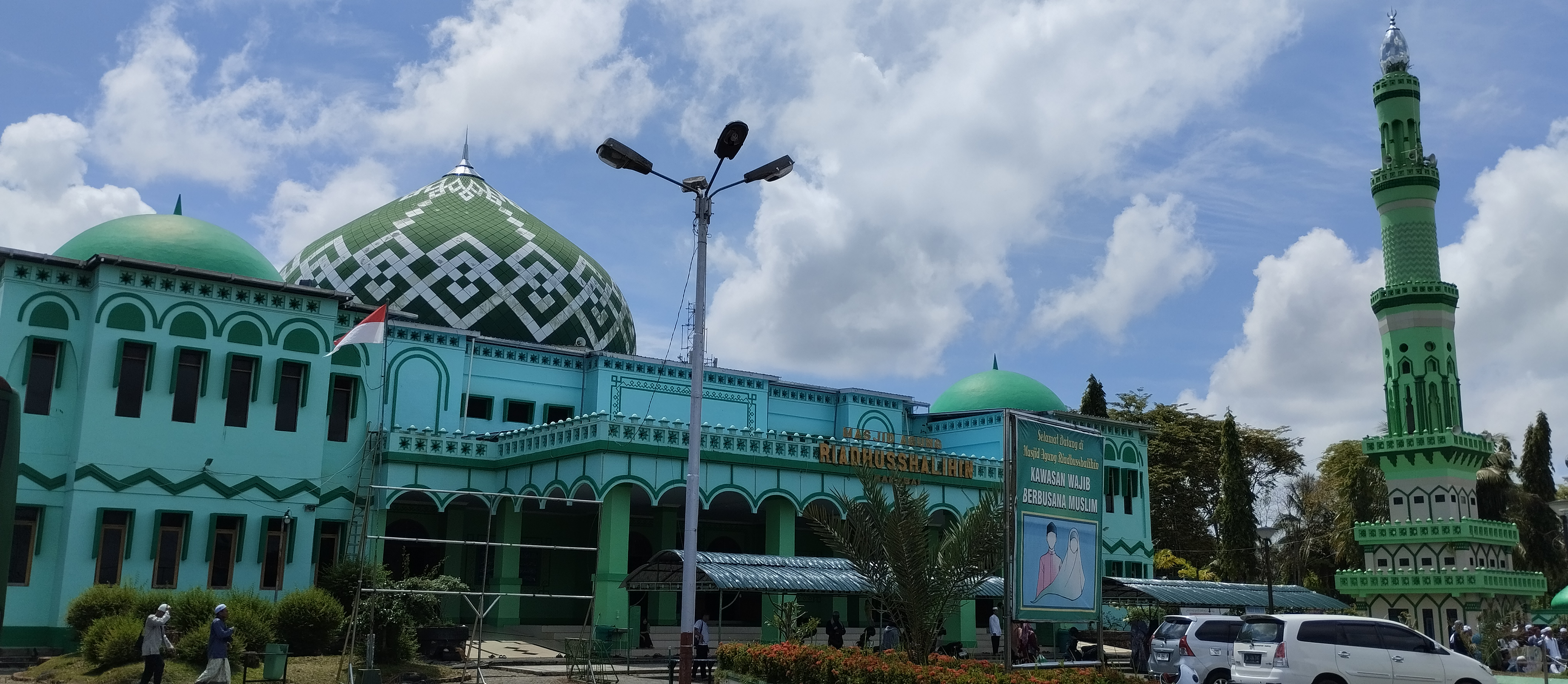

Religion
- Affiliation: Islam
- Branch/tradition: Sunni

Location
- Location: Barabai, South Kalimantan, Indonesia
- Interactive map of Great Mosque of Riyadusshalihin

Architecture
- Type: Mosque
- Established: 1962

Great Mosque of Riyadusshalihin is a mosque in Barabai, Hulu Sungai Tengah Regency, South Kalimantan Province, Indonesia. The mosque was built in 1962 and it is one of the most important religious and tourist sites in Barabai.

The construction of the mosque was based on the intention of an Indonesian Military General Amirmachmud. During an occasion of his visit to Barabai, he intended to establish a mosque by buying a plot of land for one million rupiah which is then offered to the Mosque Construction Committee. The intention to build a mosque from General Amirmachmud received positive response from many parties, thus aids were issued from local and outside donors, and also from the central government, the Ministry of Religious Affairs and the local government of the regency which allocated special funds for the completion of construction.

Over time the construction of the mosque continued to experience changes and improvements, from changes in designs for sturdier structure, its outer look which employed distinctive green color, and the roof of the dome which is also replaced for preventing leakage. Changes also took shape in the front of the mosque and the front yard of the mosque which combined diverse plants and lights in every corner. The capacity is enough for thousands of pilgrims both for the first and second floors.
