= Jameh Mosque of Sarabi =

Mosque in Tuyserkan, Hamadan, Iran

- Location of the mosque in Iran

Religion
- Affiliation: Shia Islam
- Ecclesiastical or organizational status: Mosque
- Status: Active

Location
- Location: Imam Hossein St, Tuyserkan, Hamadan Province
- Country: Iran
- Interactive map of Jameh Mosque of Sarabi
- Coordinates: 34°32′00″N 48°28′11″E

Architecture
- Type: Mosque architecture
- Style: Qajar
- Completed: Qajar dynasty
- Dome: One (maybe more)

Iran National Heritage List
- Official name: Jameh Mosque of Sarabi
- Type: Archaeological
- Designated: 2021
- Reference no.: 5050
- Conservation organization: Cultural Heritage, Handicrafts and Tourism Organization of Iran

The Jameh Mosque of Sarabi (Persian: مسجد جامع سرابی; Arabic: جامع سرابي) is a Shi'ite Friday mosque, located in the Sarabi area of Tuyserkan, in the province of Hamadan, Iran. The mosque was completed during the Qajar era.

The mosque was added to the Iran National Heritage List in 2021, administered by the Cultural Heritage, Handicrafts and Tourism Organization of Iran.

== See also ==
- Shia Islam in Iran
- List of mosques in Iran
