= Jameh Mosque of Abarkuh =

Mosque in Abarkuh, Yazd province, Iran

Jāmeh Mosque of Abarkuh
- مسجد جامع ابرکوه
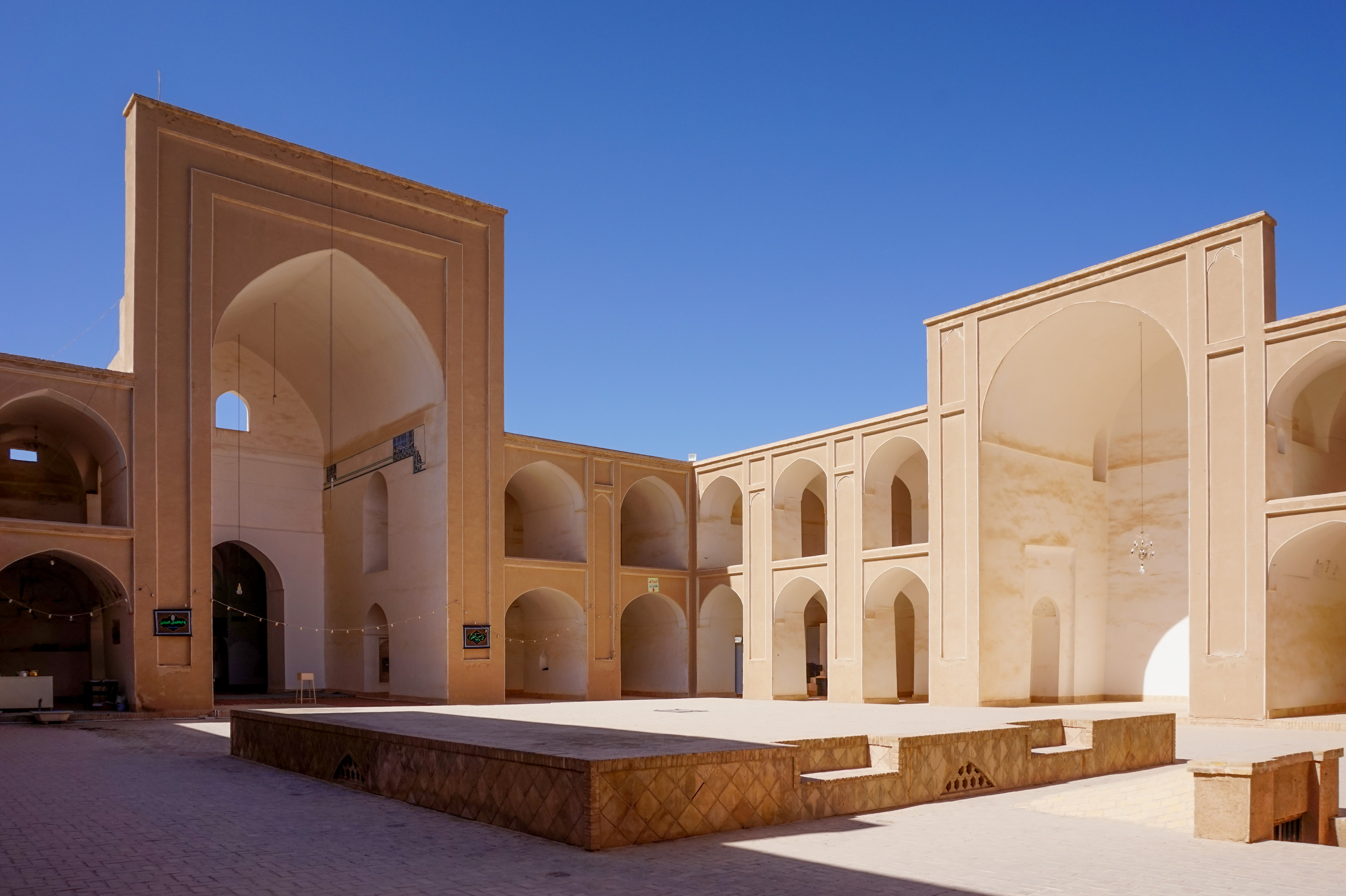
- The mosque entrance iwans in 2018

- Location of the mosque in Iran

Religion
- Affiliation: Shia Islam
- Ecclesiastical or organisational status: Friday mosque
- Status: Active

Location
- Location: Abarkuh, Yazd Province
- Country: Iran
- Coordinates: 31°7′49″N 53°17′8″E

Architecture
- Type: Mosque architecture
- Style: Buyid; Seljuk; Ilkhanid; Timurid; Safavid
- Completed: 10th century CE (prime); 12th century CE (shabestan); 1328 CE (annex); 1338 CE (mihrab)

Specifications
- Dome: One (maybe more)
- Minaret: Two
- Materials: Bricks; plaster; stone; marble; tiles; mortar

Iran National Heritage List
- Official name: Friday Mosque of Abarkuh
- Type: Friday Mosque
- Designated: 1933
- Reference no.: 197
- Conservation organization: Cultural Heritage, Handicrafts and Tourism Organization of Iran

The Jāmeh Mosque of Abarkuh (Persian: مسجد جامع ابرکوه) is a Shi'ite Friday mosque (jāmeh) located in Abarkuh, in the province of Yazd, Iran. Completed initially during the Buyid era, with subsequent additions and modifications during the Seljuk, Ilkhanid, Timurid, and Safavid eras, the mosque is located adjacent to the city square, and was completed, after many modifications, in 1338 CE.

The mosque was added to the Iran National Heritage List on 31 July 1933, administered by the Cultural Heritage, Handicrafts and Tourism Organization of Iran.

== Gallery ==
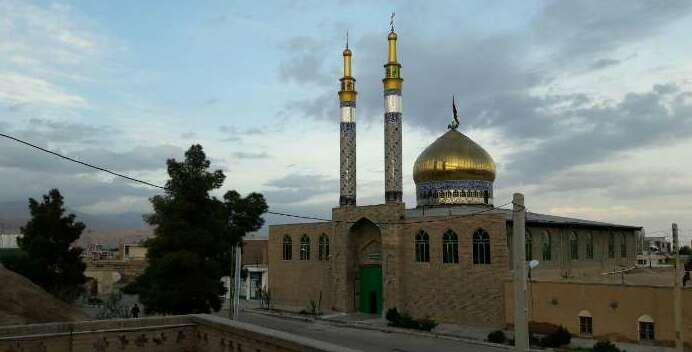
The mosque in 2017

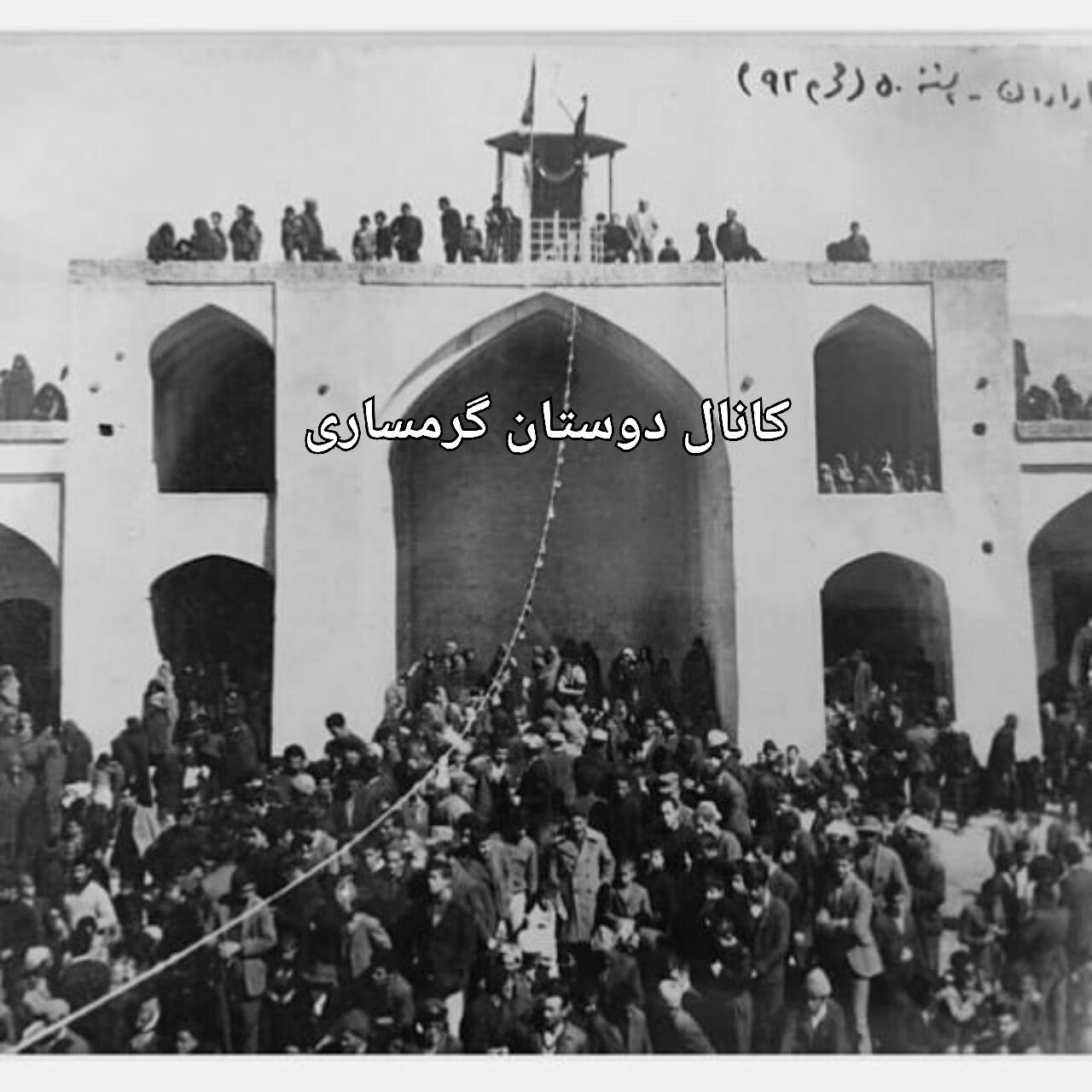
Worshippers in front of the mosque, undated

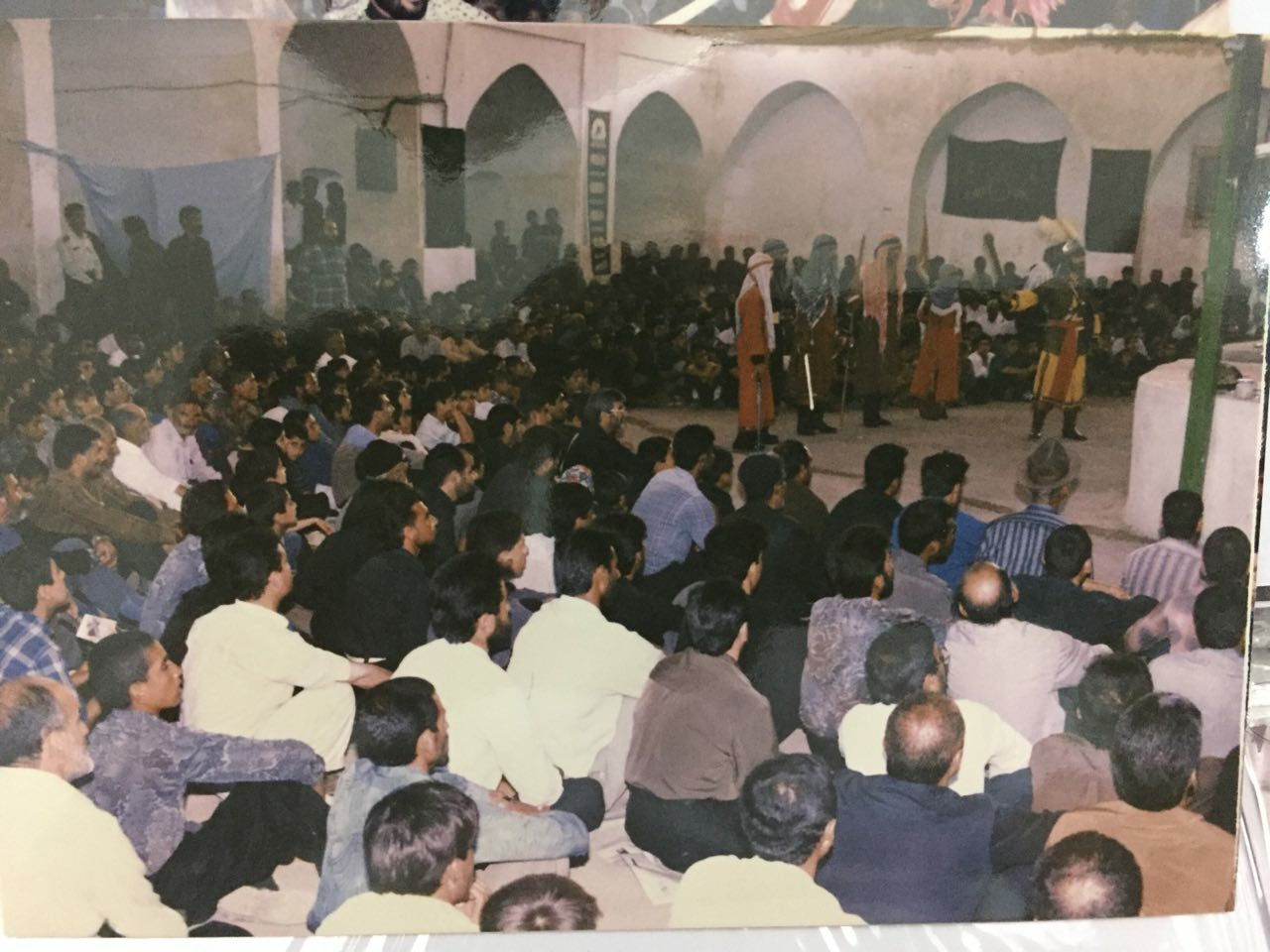
Worshippers inside the mosque, undated

== See also ==
- Shia Islam in Iran
- List of mosques in Iran
