= Jameh Mosque of Kerman =

Mosque in Kerman, Iran

- مسجد جامع کرمان
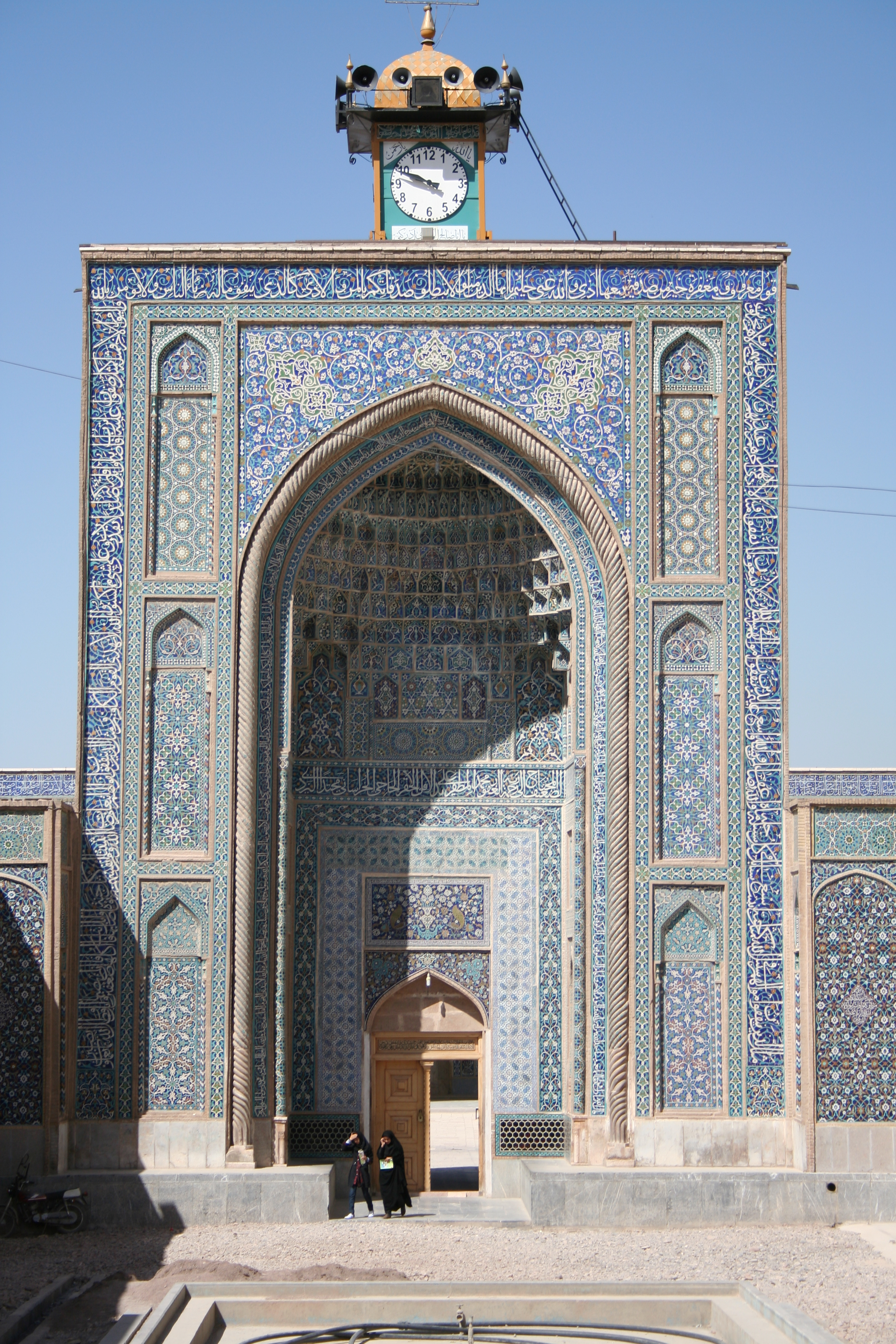

- Location of the mosque in Iran

Religion
- Affiliation: Shia Islam
- Ecclesiastical or organisational status: Friday mosque
- Status: Active

Location
- Location: Kerman, Kerman County, Kerman Province
- Country: Iran
- Coordinates: 30°17′34″N 57°5′5″E

Architecture
- Type: Mosque architecture
- Style: Ilkhanid
- Completed: 1350 CE; Muzaffarid era
- Dome: One

Iran National Heritage List
- Official name: Friday Mosque of Kerman
- Type: Friday Mosque
- Designated: 1937
- Reference no.: 276
- Conservation organization: Cultural Heritage, Handicrafts and Tourism Organization of Iran

The Jameh Mosque of Kerman (Persian: مسجد جامع کرمان; Arabic: جامع كرمان) is a Shi'ite Friday mosque located in the city of Kerman, in the province of Kerman, Iran.

== Overview ==
The Ilkhanid-style mosque was built at the time of Mubariz al-Din Muhammad, Muzaffarids, in 1350 CE. The western side of the building features a high portal which has been decorated with decorative tile-works and a watch tower.

The mosque was added to the Iran National Heritage List in 1937, administered by the Cultural Heritage, Handicrafts and Tourism Organization of Iran.

== Gallery ==
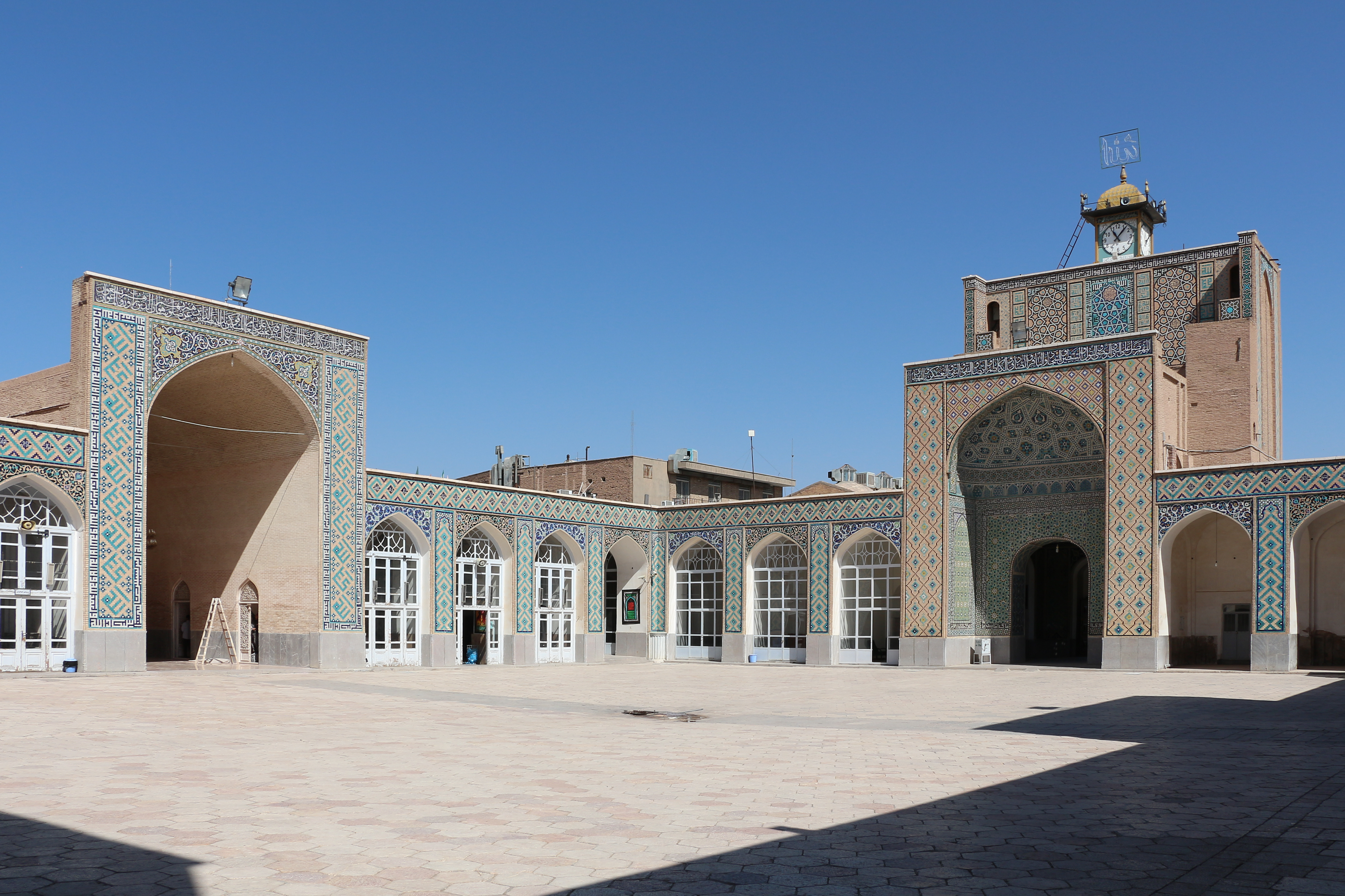

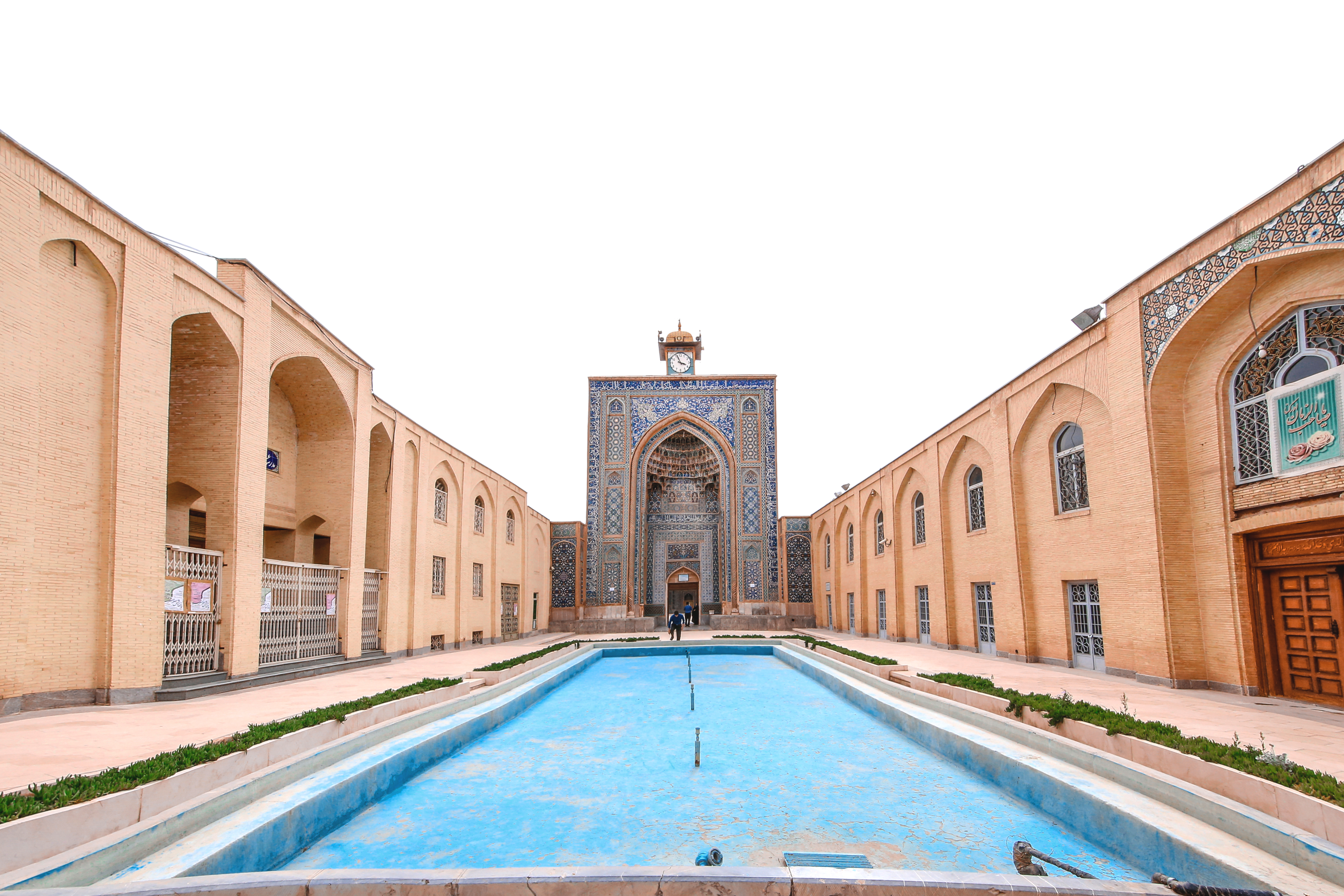

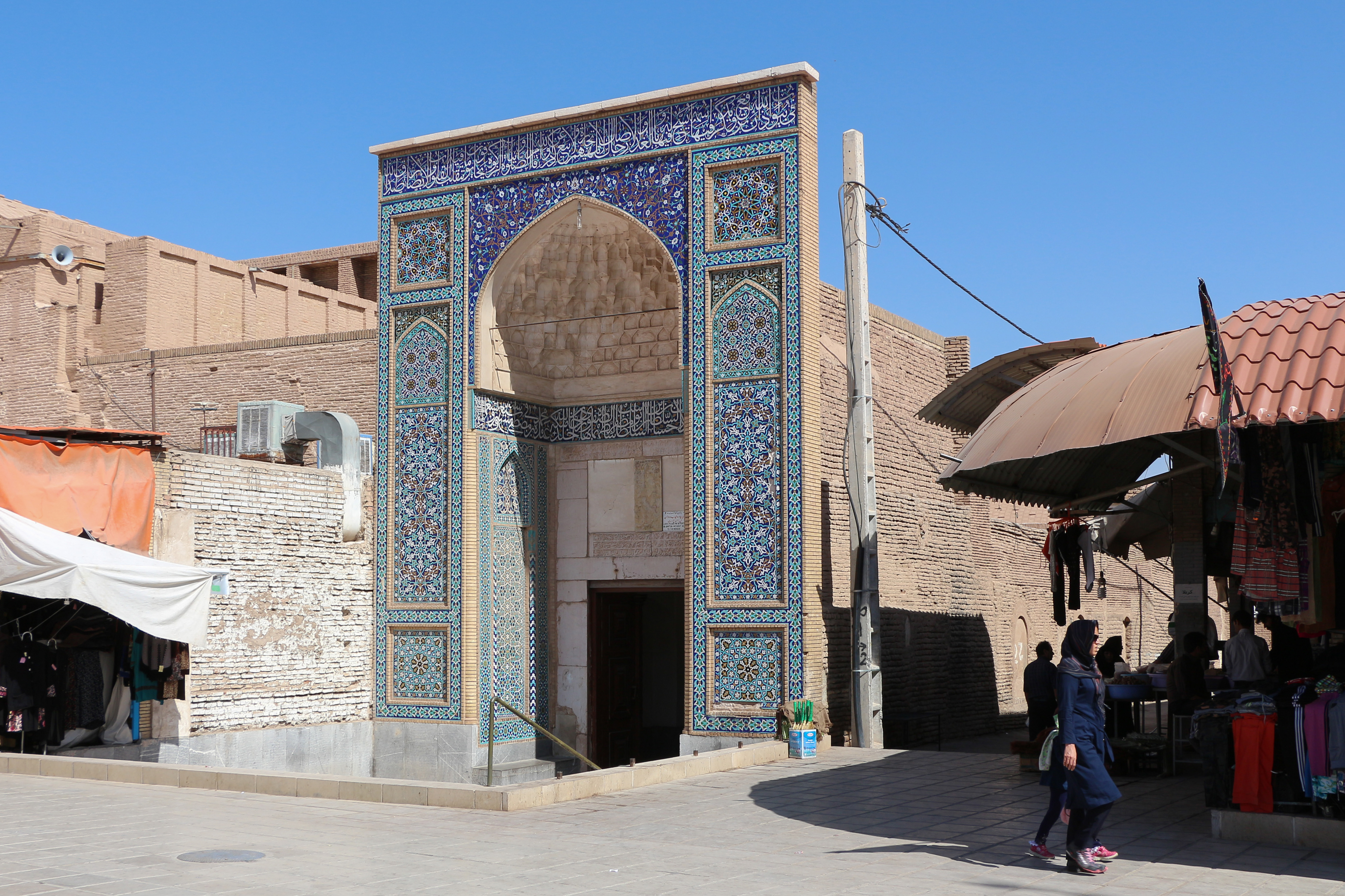

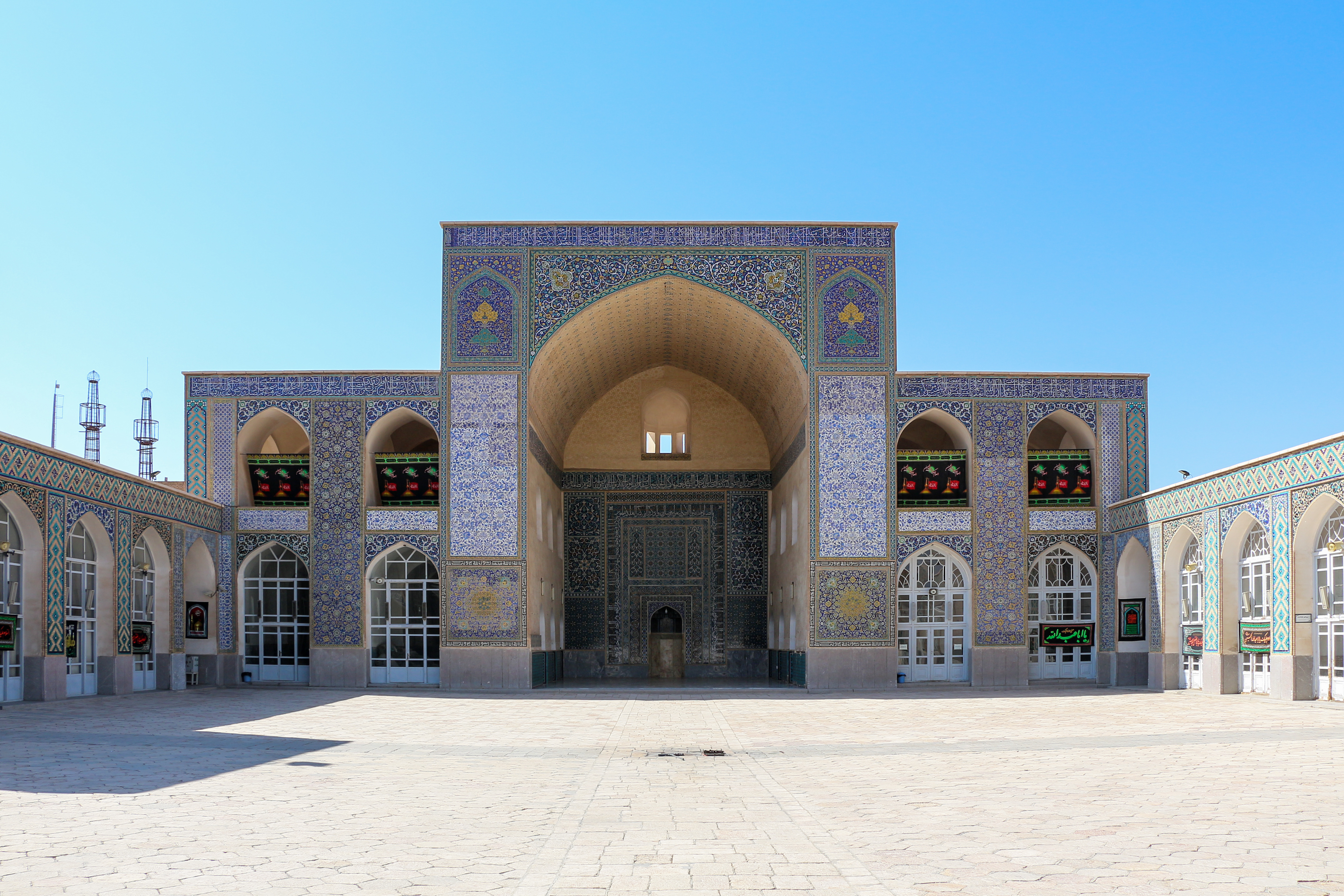

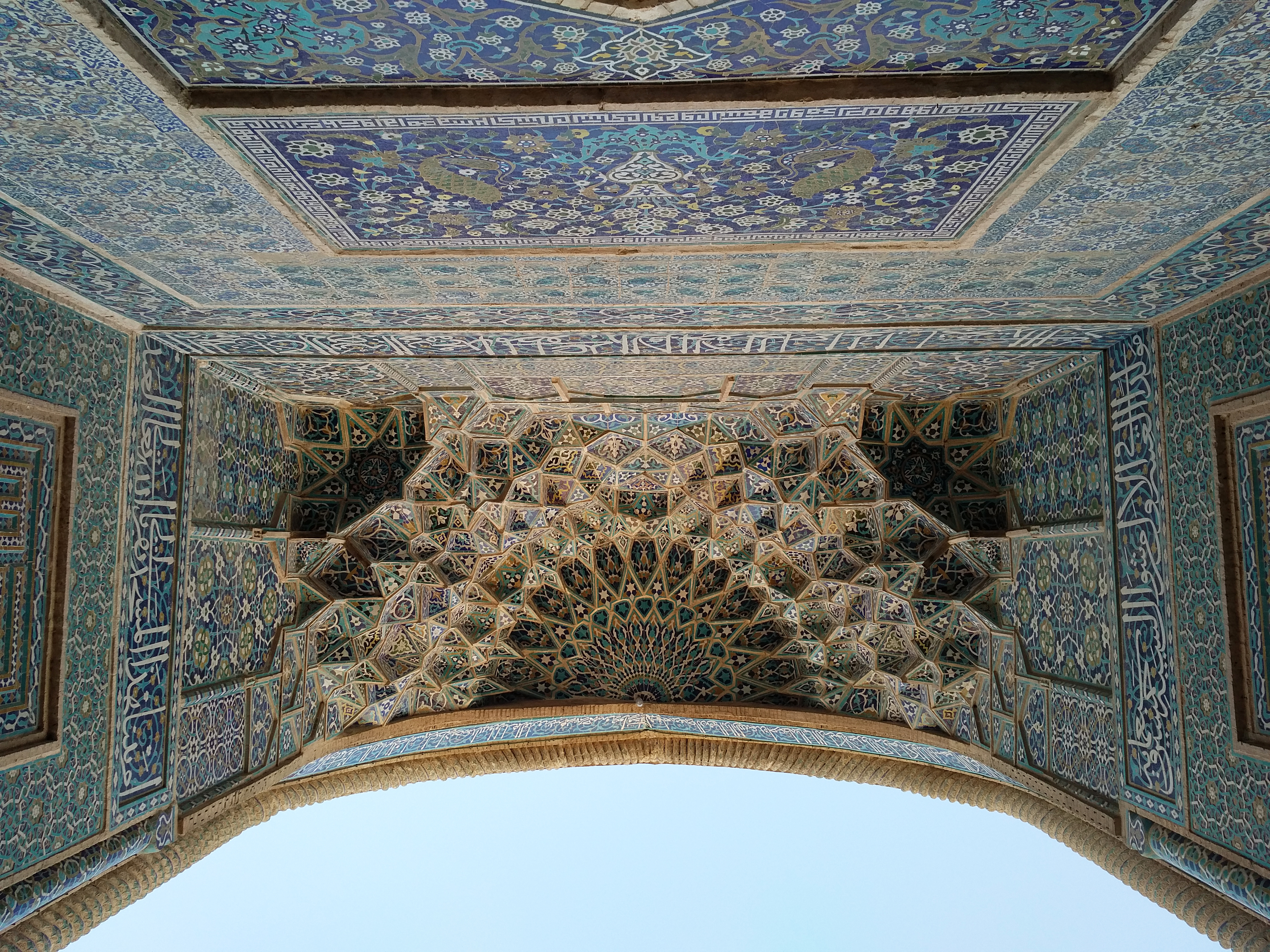

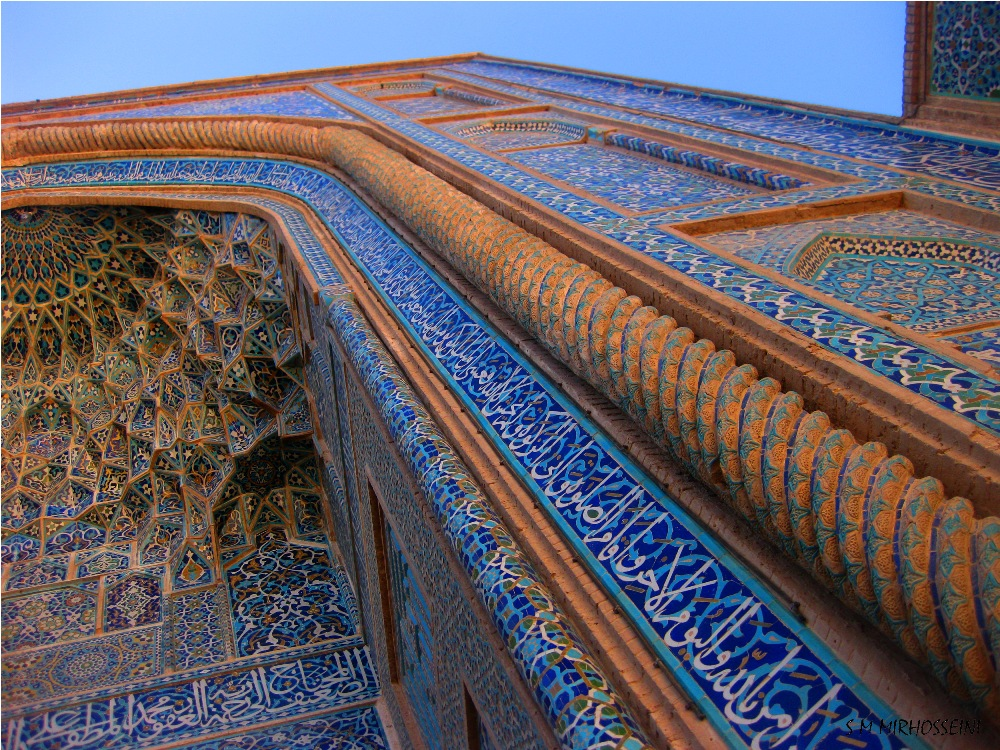

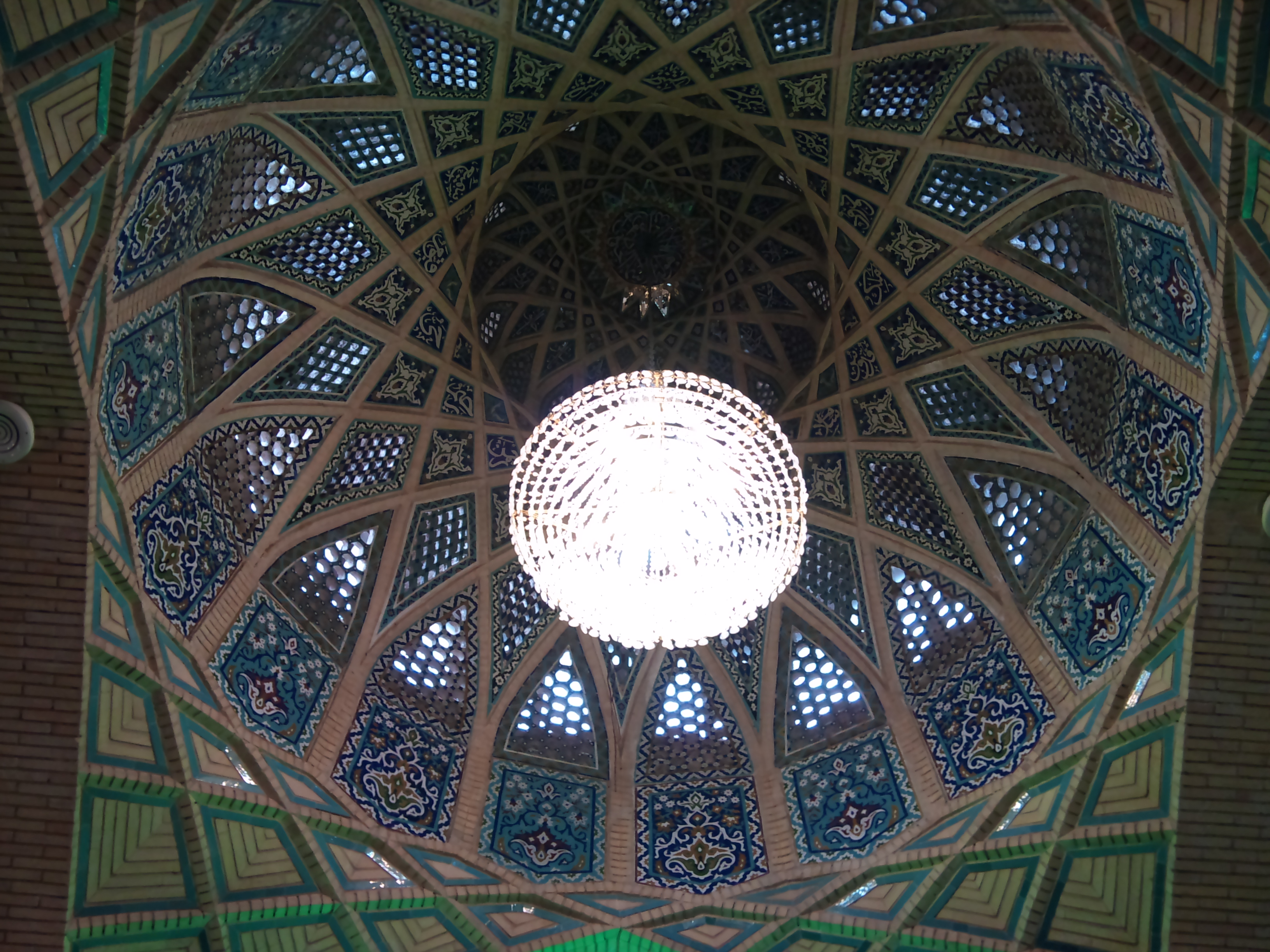

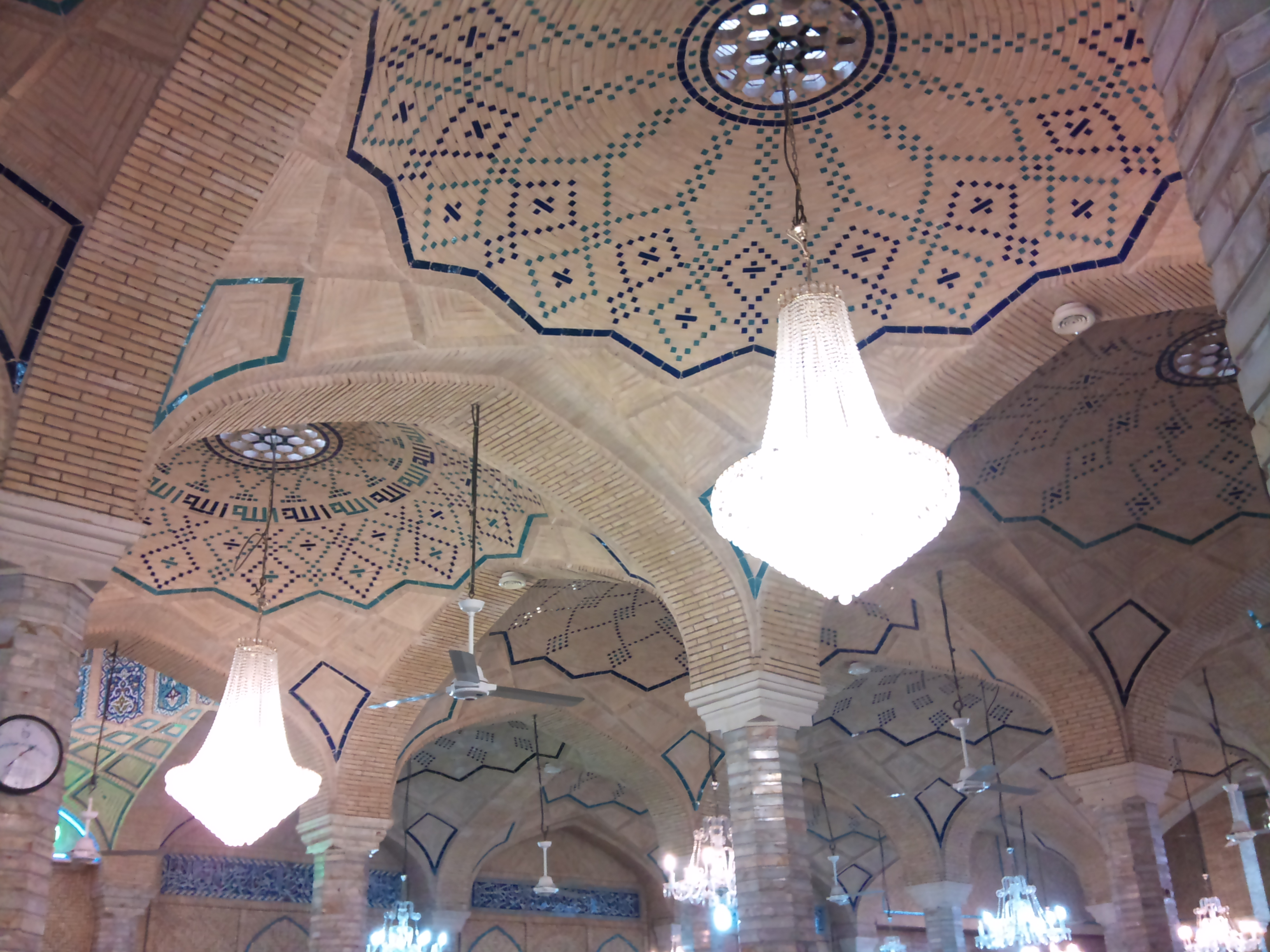

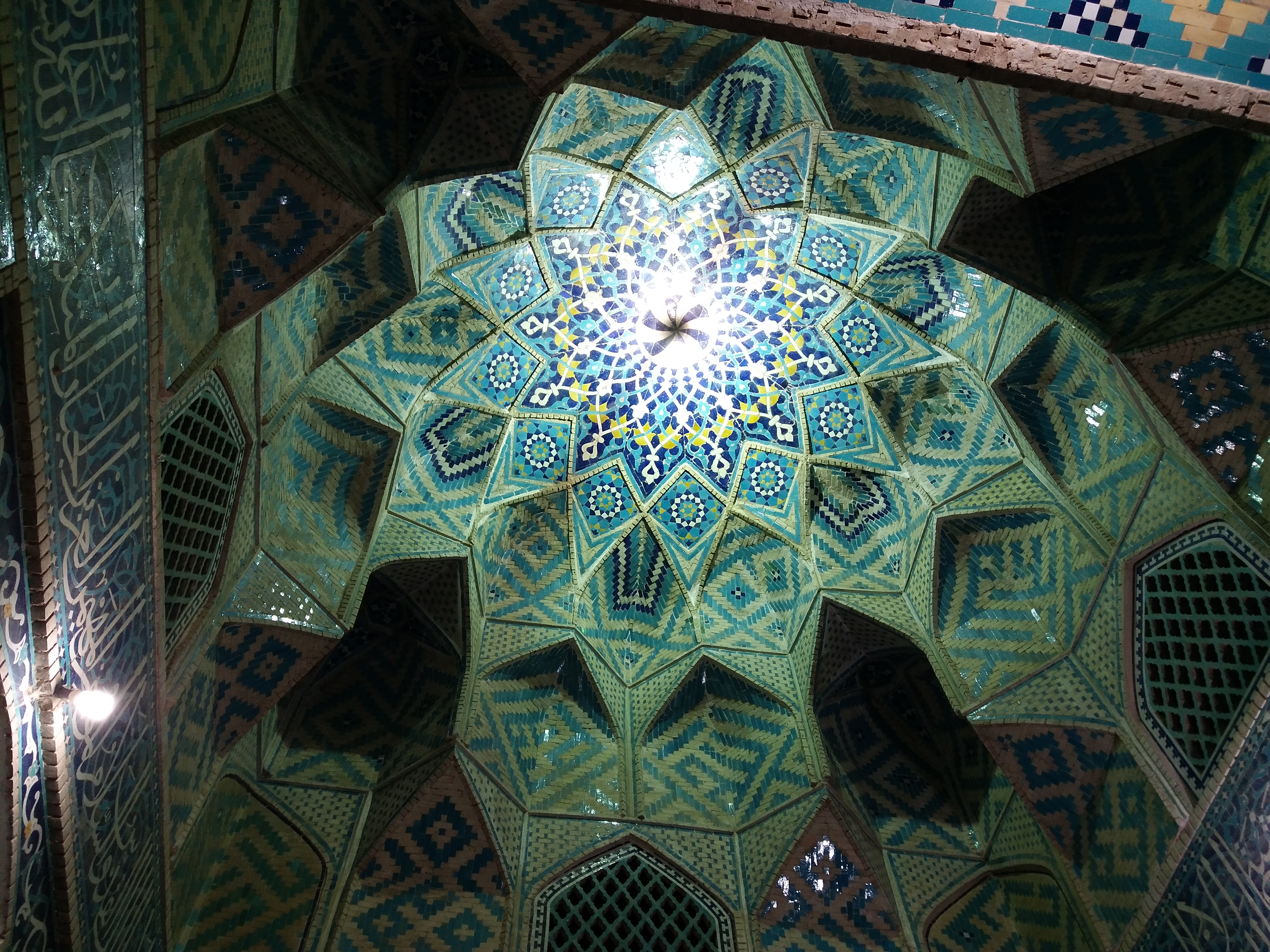

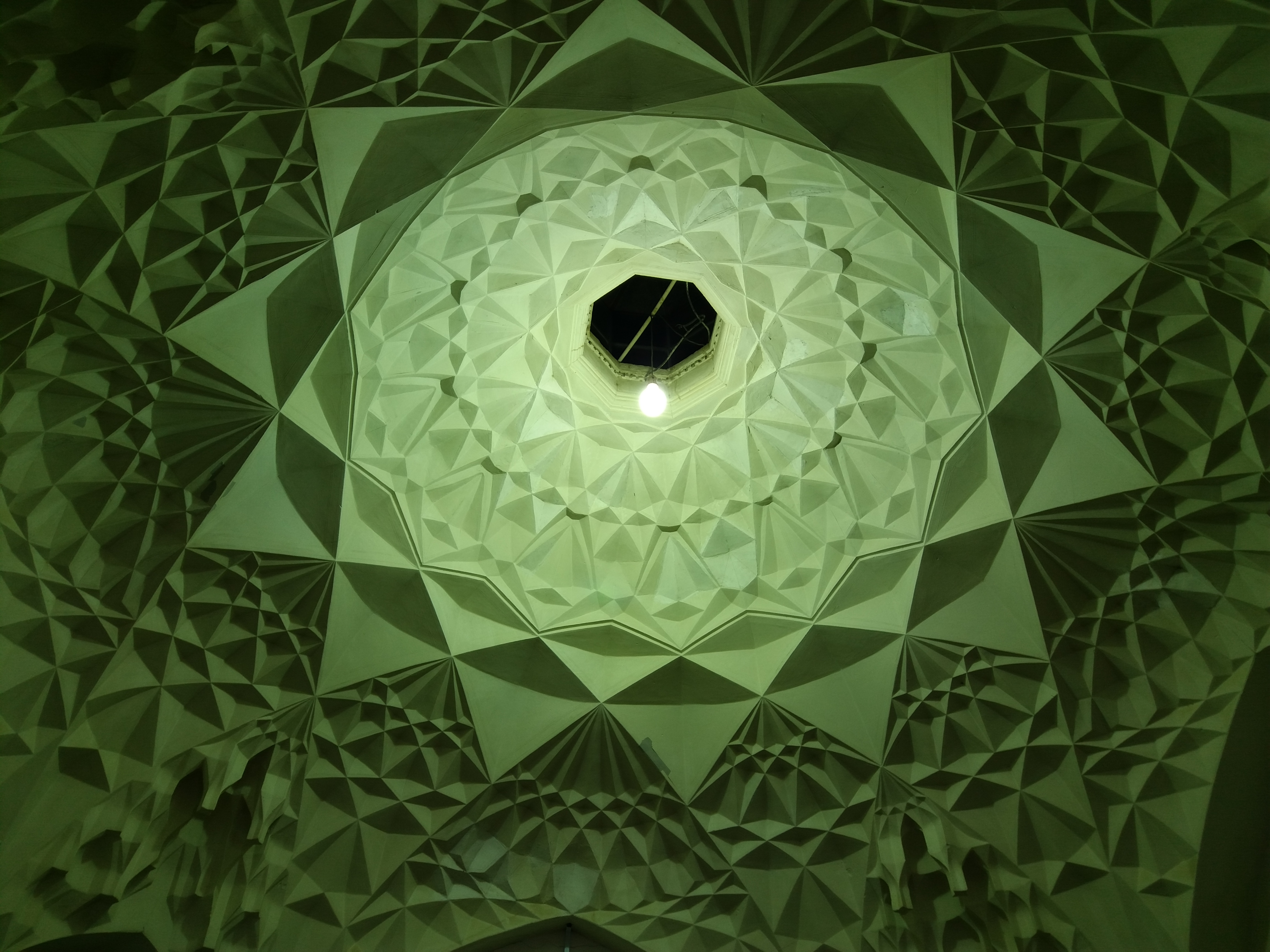

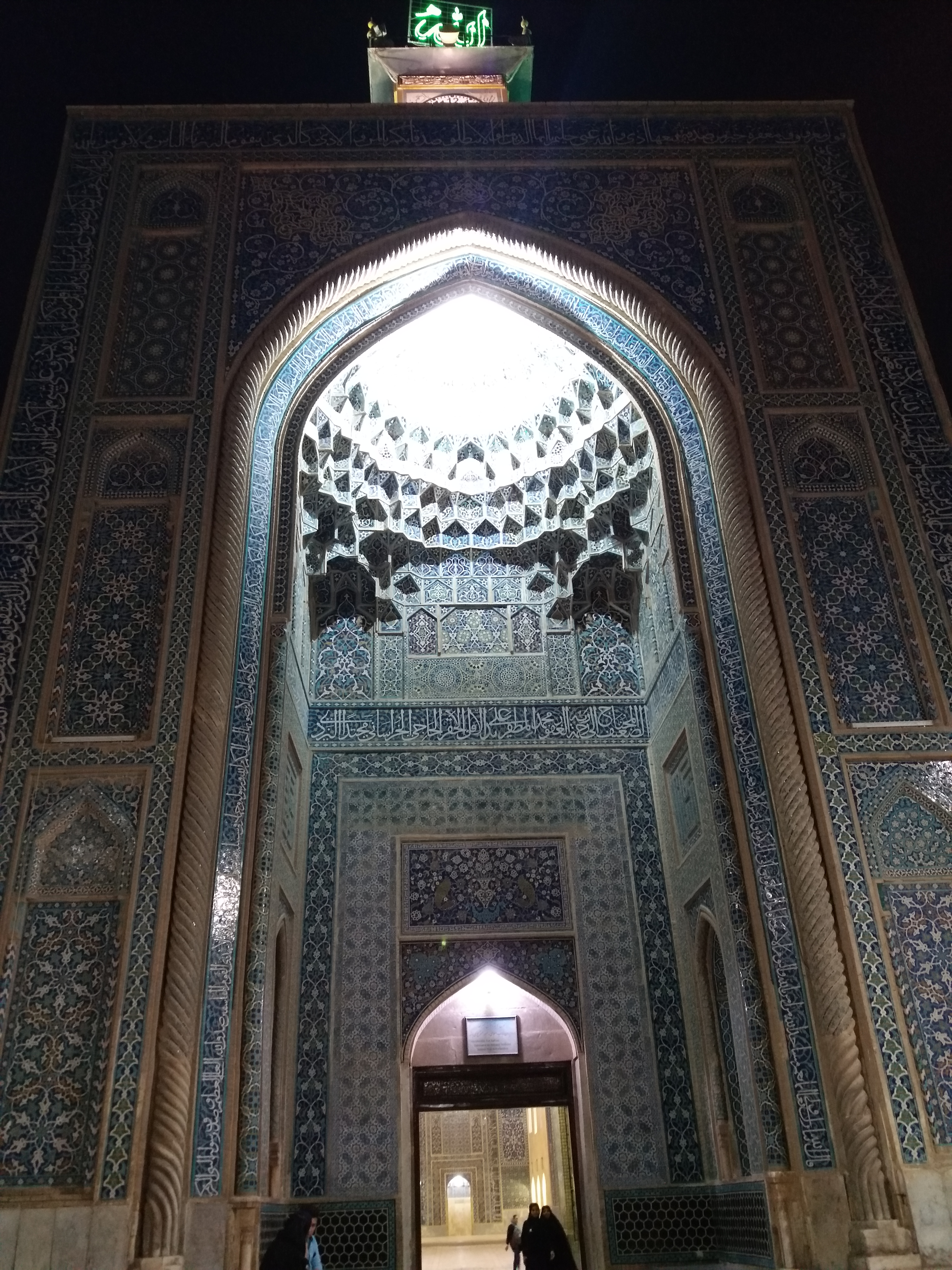

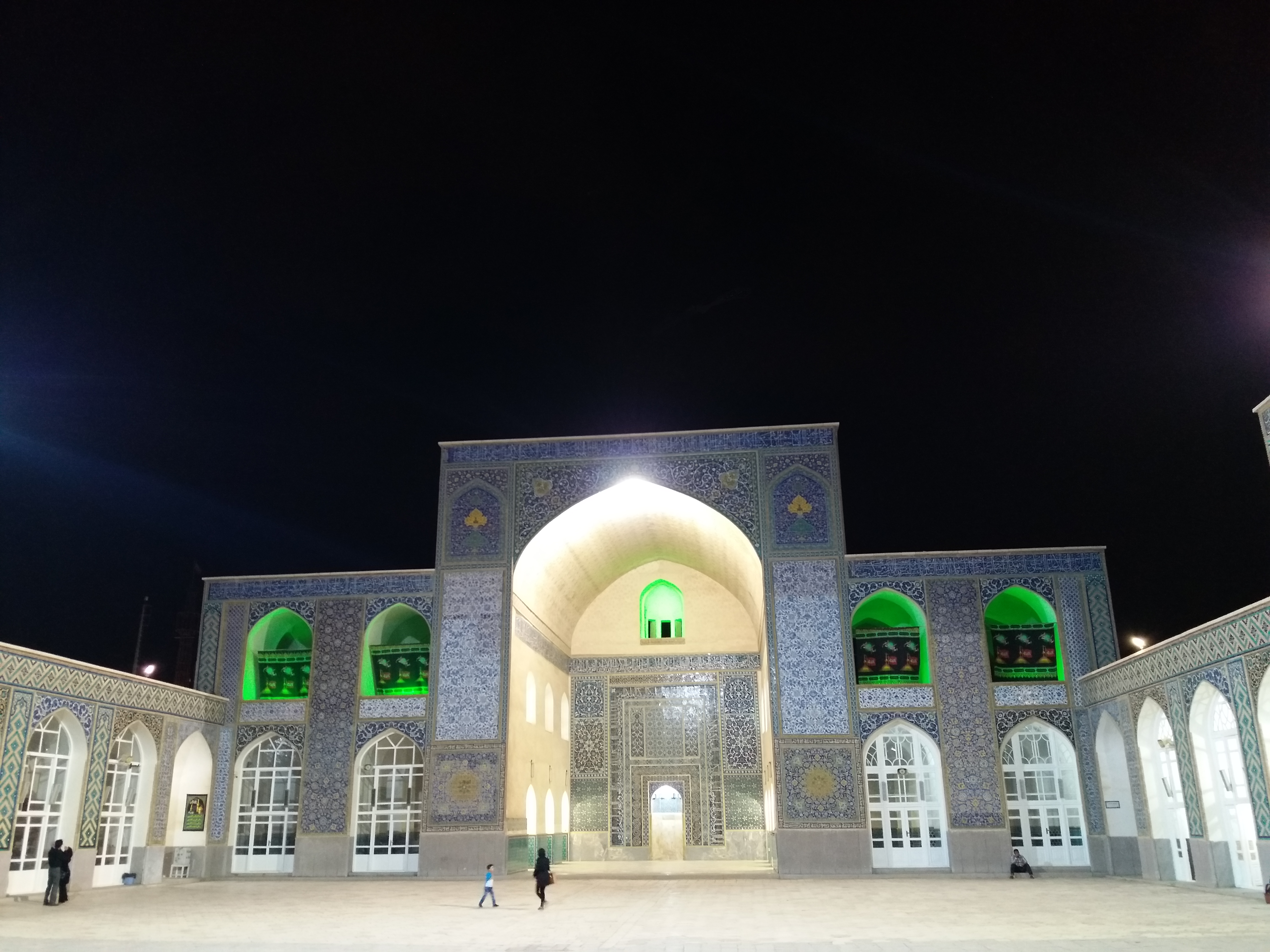

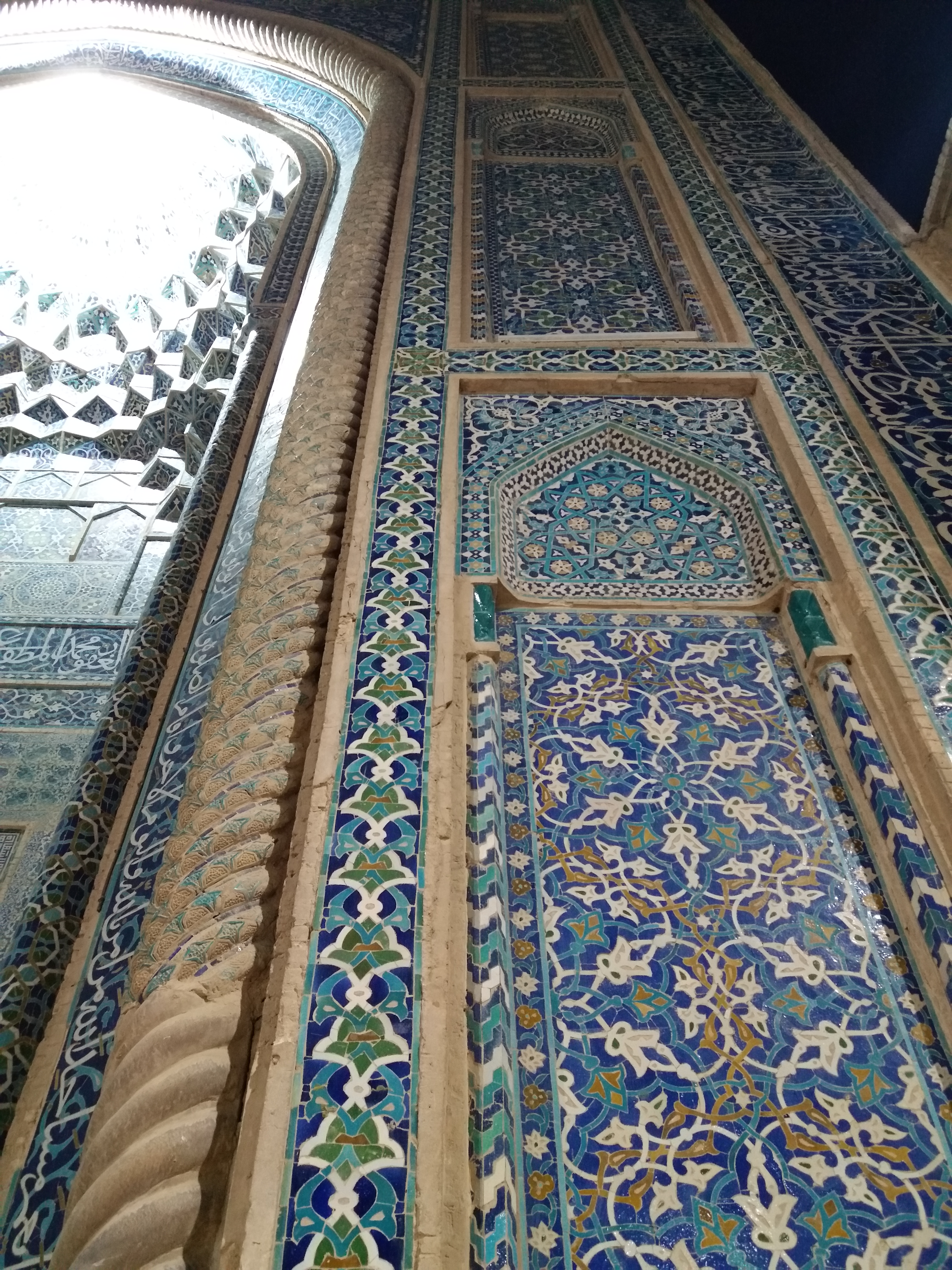

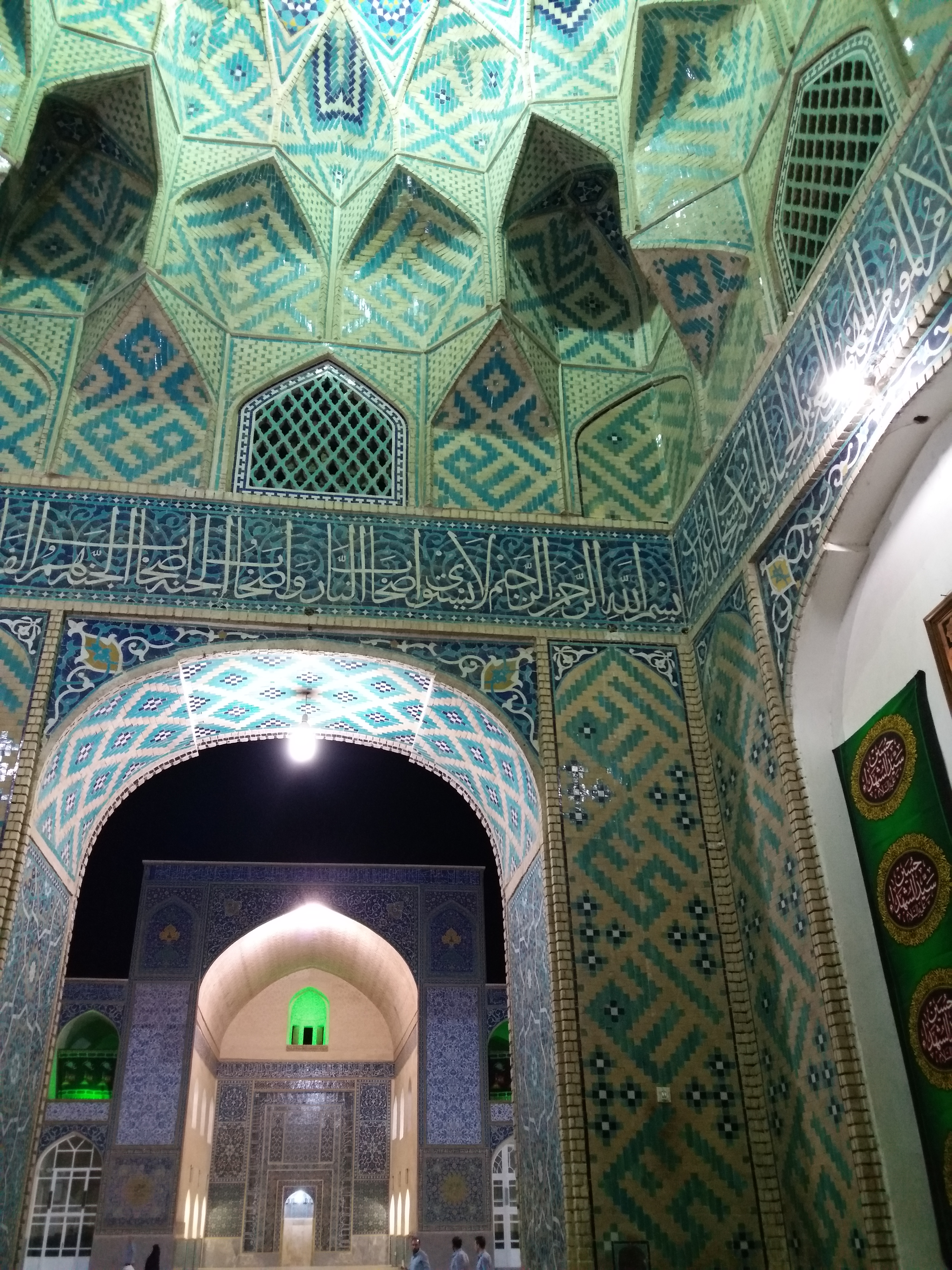

== See also ==
- Shia Islam in Iran
- List of mosques in Iran
