= Dome of Soltaniyeh =

Mausoleum in Soltaniyeh, Iranian national heritage site

Dome of Soltaniyeh گنبد سلطانیه

- Location of the mausoleum in Iran

Religion
- Affiliation: Islam
- Ecclesiastical or organisational status: Mausoleum
- Status: Active

Location
- Location: Soltaniyeh, Zanjan province
- Country: Iran
- Interactive map of Dome of Soltaniyeh گنبد سلطانیه
- Coordinates: 36°26′2.3″N 48°47′45.7″E

Architecture
- Type: Islamic architecture
- Style: Ilkhanid architecture
- Completed: c. 1313 CE

Specifications
- Dome: One
- Dome height (outer): 50 m (160 ft)
- Dome dia. (outer): 25 m (82 ft)
- Minaret: Six
- Shrine: One: Öljaitü
- Materials: Bricks; tiles; plaster; marble; timber; bronze; gold; silver
- Location within Iran

UNESCO World Heritage Site
- Official name: Mausoleum of Oljaytu
- Part of: Soltaniyeh
- Criteria: Cultural: (ii), (iii), (iv)
- Reference: 1188-001
- Inscription: 2005 (29th Session)
- Area: 790 ha (2,000 acres)
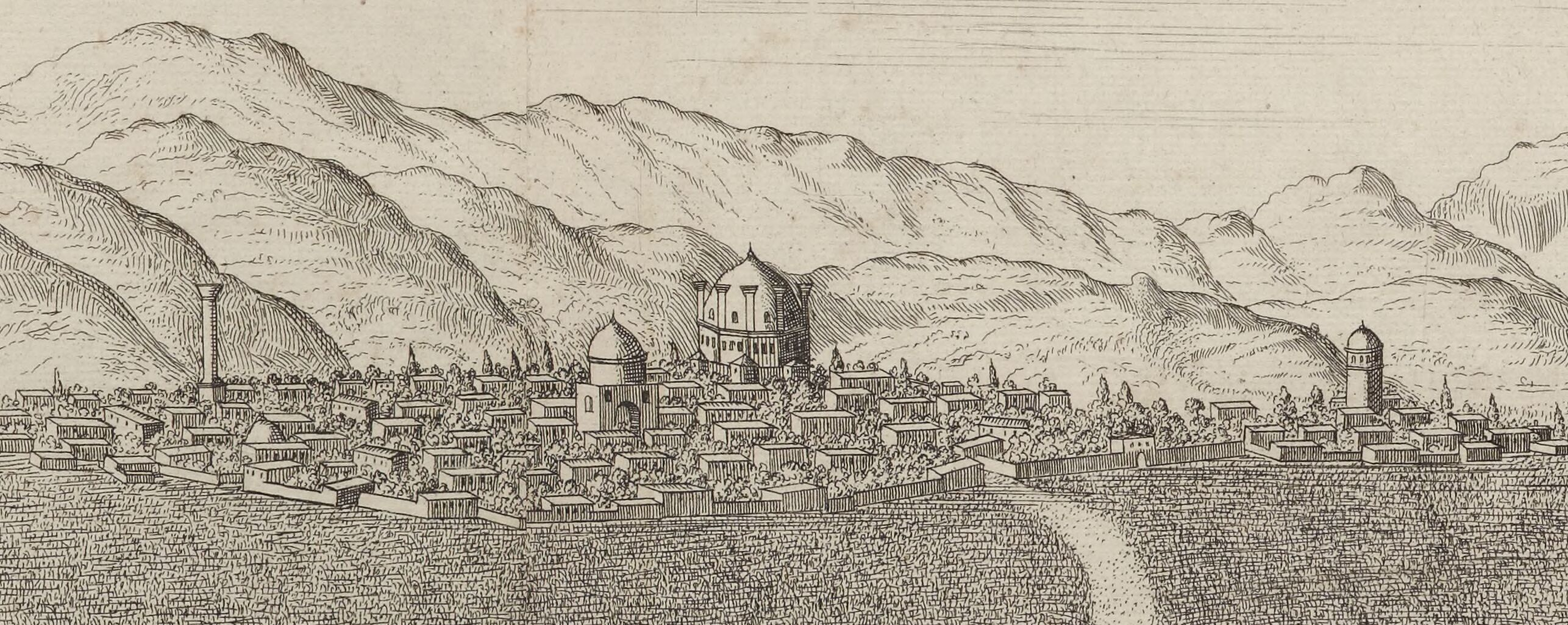
- Jean Chardin etching of the dome in 1673

Iran National Heritage List
- Official name: Dome of Soltaniyeh
- Type: Mausoleum
- Designated: 1932
- Reference no.: 166
- Conservation organization: Cultural Heritage, Handicrafts and Tourism Organization of Iran

The Dome of Soltaniyeh (Persian: گنبد سلطانیه; Arabic: قبة السلطانية) – variously called the Mausoleum of Oljaytu, Tomb of Uljaytu, or Soltaniya complex, among other designations – is a historic mausoleum and monument complex, located in Soltaniyeh, Zanjan, Iran. It was built as the mausoleum of the Ilkhanid Mongol ruler Öljaitü (also known as Muhammad Khodabandeh). It was originally the centerpiece of a larger complex of buildings that included a mosque, residences, and other services, though these other buildings have generally not been preserved.

The mausoleum was built sometime between 1307 and 1313 CE. Its double-shelled main dome is one of the largest brick domes in the world, measuring almost 25 metres (82 ft) in diameter and approximately 50 metres (160 ft) high. Much of its exterior decoration has been lost, but the interior retains superb mosaics, faience, and murals. The Dome of Soltaniyeh paved the way for more daring Iranian-style cupola constructions in the Persianate world, such as the Mausoleum of Khoja Ahmed Yasavi and the Taj Mahal. Its importance in the Islamic world may be compared to that of Brunelleschi's cupola for Christian architecture. The structure is currently undergoing extensive renovation.

The mausoleum was added to the Iran National Heritage List on 6 January 1932 and is administered by the Cultural Heritage, Handicrafts and Tourism Organization of Iran; and, since 2005, has formed part of the UNESCO World Heritage site of Soltaniyeh.

== History and patronage ==
The Mongol invasion of the Islamic world began with the conquest of eastern Iran in 1221, and ultimately ended the period of Abbasid rule (750-1258). The Mongols conquered most of West Asia, and a branch of the dynasty known as the Ilkhanids (1256-1353) concentrated most of their power in Iran.

The Mongol presence in Iran was marked by a shift away from traditional cities dependent on an agricultural hinterland to ones with an emphasis on access to pasture. An example of this new type of Mongol city was the city of Sultaniyya in northwestern Iran. Arghun, the Ilkhanid ruler of Iran at the time, established Sultaniyya as his summer capital. His son, Muhammad Oljeitu Khudabanda, furthered the city’s development and transformed it into the capital of the empire. After Oljeitu’s death, the city began a steady decline. Today, only two buildings remain that which show evidence signs of Sultaniyya’s its former wealth and importance: the octagonal tomb of the Dome of Soltaniyeh and an adjacent khanaqah, a building designed specifically for Sufi gatherings as a spiritual retreat. The quality of the preserved tomb attests to the richness of its patronage by the Sultan Oljeitu.

The large domed tomb chamber of Oljeitu was meant to rival the colossal tomb built by the Seljuq Sultan Sanjar at Merv in 1157. The tomb of Oljeitu has an octagonal plan, like the Tomb of Ahmed Sanjar, with both complexes being sponsored by the Ilkhanid court and were considered some of the most prestigious buildings at the time.

The Global Heritage site of Gonbad-e-sultaniyeh has been recognised as a UNESCO World Heritage Site since 2005. It followed the specific historic UNESCO criteria landscape of four characteristics: ancient and historical monuments, farms, urban landscapes, and the Historical Grass of Soltaniyeh.

== Architecture and interior design ==
The Dome of Solteniyeh was one of the largest religious endowments of the 14th century, and was utilized for multiple functions, such as Quran reading, praying, teaching, housing, and medical purposes.

The construction of the double-shelled dome employed an interlocking arched herringbone network. The Dome of Soltaniyeh was one of the first to use this pattern in Iran, and is unique in choosing brick for its material as previous similar architectural structures often utilized wood.

As for the interior of the tomb, it is decorated in tile and plaster. The insides of the iwans’ walls possess white inscriptions that stand out against the blue background. The underside of the iwans are stuccoed with bands of ornament, that were later painted. A significant inscription--outlined with ogival forms sculpted over cloth--circles the entire dome. The galleries have low, wooden or marble railings. The windows are fitted with bronze screens, along with bronze knobs and balls set with gold and silver.

Following Islamic convention, Oljeitu’s tomb was placed in a garden, known in the Quran as a rawda. This word was also added to the railing of the Prophet Muhammad’s tomb in Medina. Because of this, rawda became the label for funerary structures in Iran. Thus, Oljeitu’s tomb was referred to as a rawda. Additionally, Oljeitu ensured that water could be successfully stored and utilized in the complex, through the use of qanats and wells. A qanat is a downward sloping channel intended to transport water. Due to this, the flora and fauna surrounding the tomb were able to survive for a long time; specifically, “the gardens around the tomb complex were still being maintained in the seventeenth century.”

A 16th c. illustration made by Matrakçı Nasuh reveals that the face of the complex was split into two stories and was “flanked by minarets and surmounted by five domes.” According to a later drawing of the tomb by Flandin and Coste, one can see possible evidence of a cap wall projecting from the northeast corner.

== Influence on other monuments ==
Because Oljeitu’s tomb was one of the most significant works of its time, it became an inspiration for many other complexes, both within and outside of Ilkhanid culture. Distinct features of the complex were later found on many other monuments, such as placement of paired minarets above a portal. This trend began in the Seljuq period, then became a normal inclusion in Ilkhanid buildings.

The Tomb of Oljeitu, like other Ilkhanid tombs, was integrated into a great complex—which no longer remains. These complexes were the “precursors of the type of large, planned funerary complexes, known as kulliye, that (were) built by the Ottomans at Bursa and elsewhere beginning in the second half of the fourteenth century.”

Another trend derived from Oljeitu’s tomb is the style of five domes placed above the portal. The Blue Mosque built by Saliha Khanum in Tabriz was inspired by this design; its portal and projecting sanctuary were very similar to Oljeitu’s complex. This famous tomb of Oljeitu remained an inspiration for several imperial Mongolian tombs, even the Taj Mahal.

=== Similarities with the Santa Maria Del Fiore ===
The Dome of Soltaniyeh features many architectural similarities to Brunelisschi’s dome for the Santa Maria Del Fiore.

There are several architectural similarities between the two domes. Structurally, both domes feature an arched network of herringbone bricks, called in Italian “spina -di -pesce”. The Dome of Soltaniyeh's high sphero-conical dome on an octagonal base exhibits is the same structure as the Santa Maria Del Fiore, both with eight ribs supporting each structure.

Finally both domes, feature a double-shelled structure. The Dome of Soltaniyeh was the first example of this structure in Iran, and several scholars hypothesize that it is possible for the construction system of Soltaniyeh to have been disseminated from Iran to Brunelleschi in Italy, in the time span of almost a century.

Many academics argue that because of these similarities, and many more, that the Dome of Soltaniyeh influenced the Santa Maria Del Fiore, which was constructed 100 years later. However, it is possible that Bruneleschi and his engineers may have independently come up with the same solutions to similar architectural challenges that both domes faced.

== Gallery ==
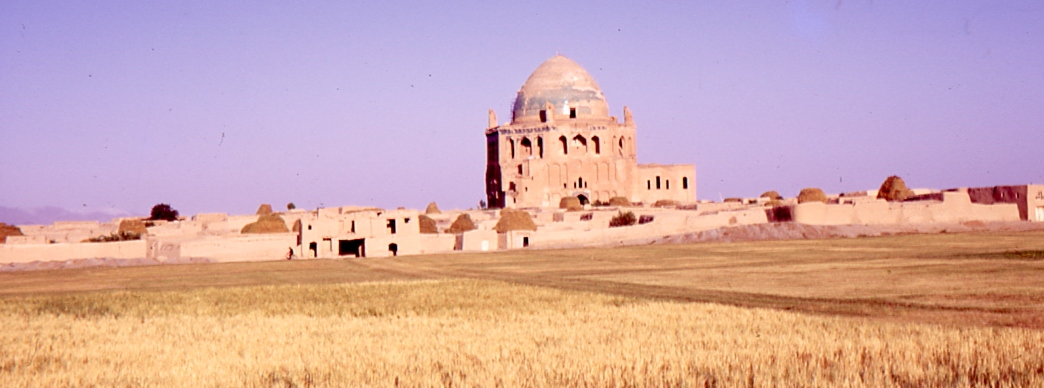
Village of Soltaniyeh and dome in 1969

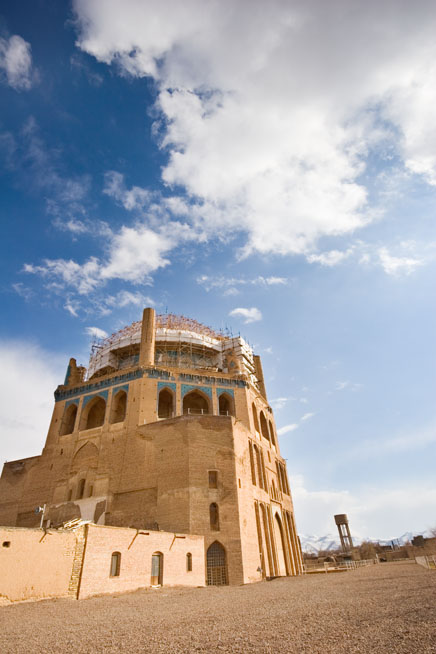
The dome structure and its six minarets, under restoration by ICHTO

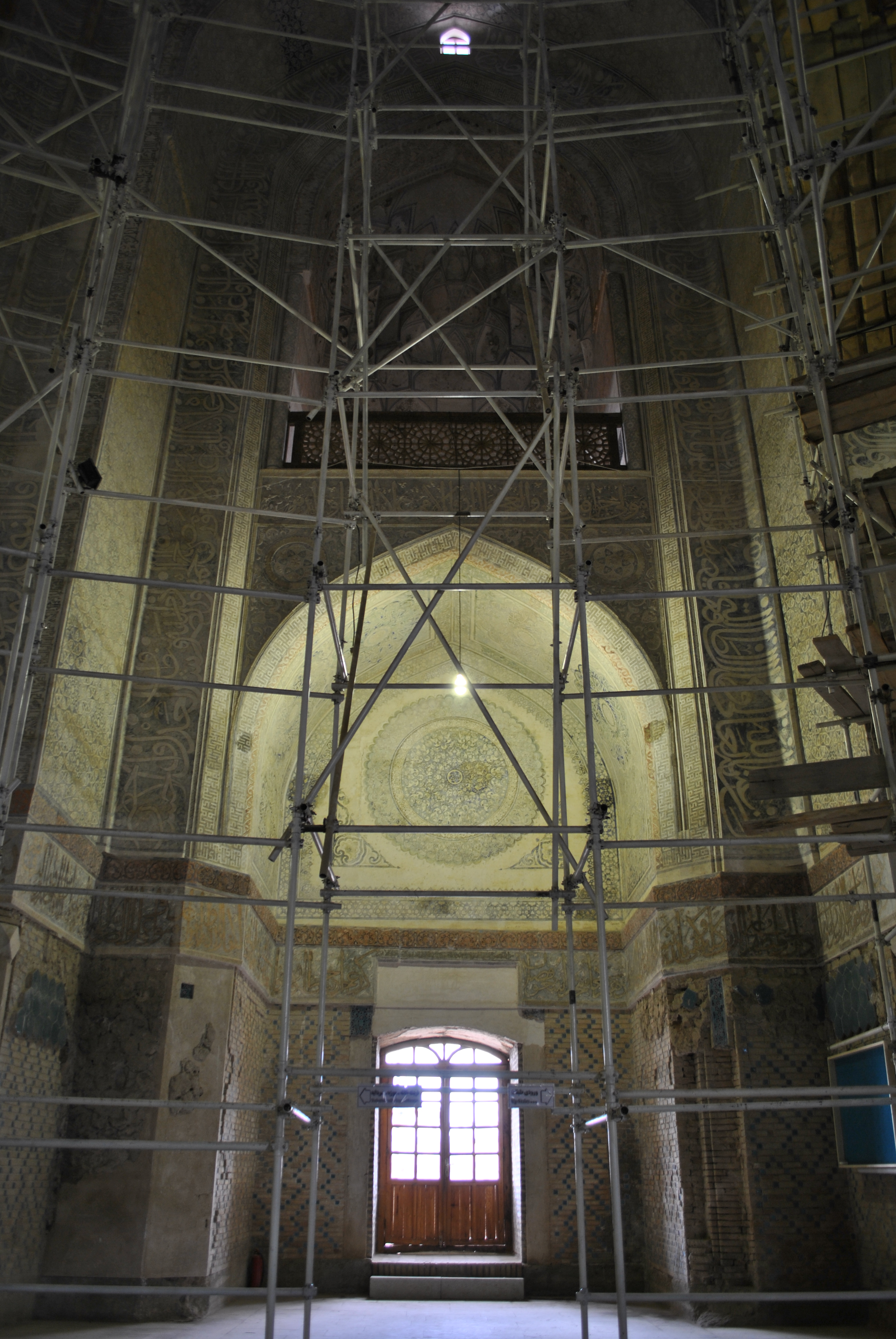
Major reconstruction inside

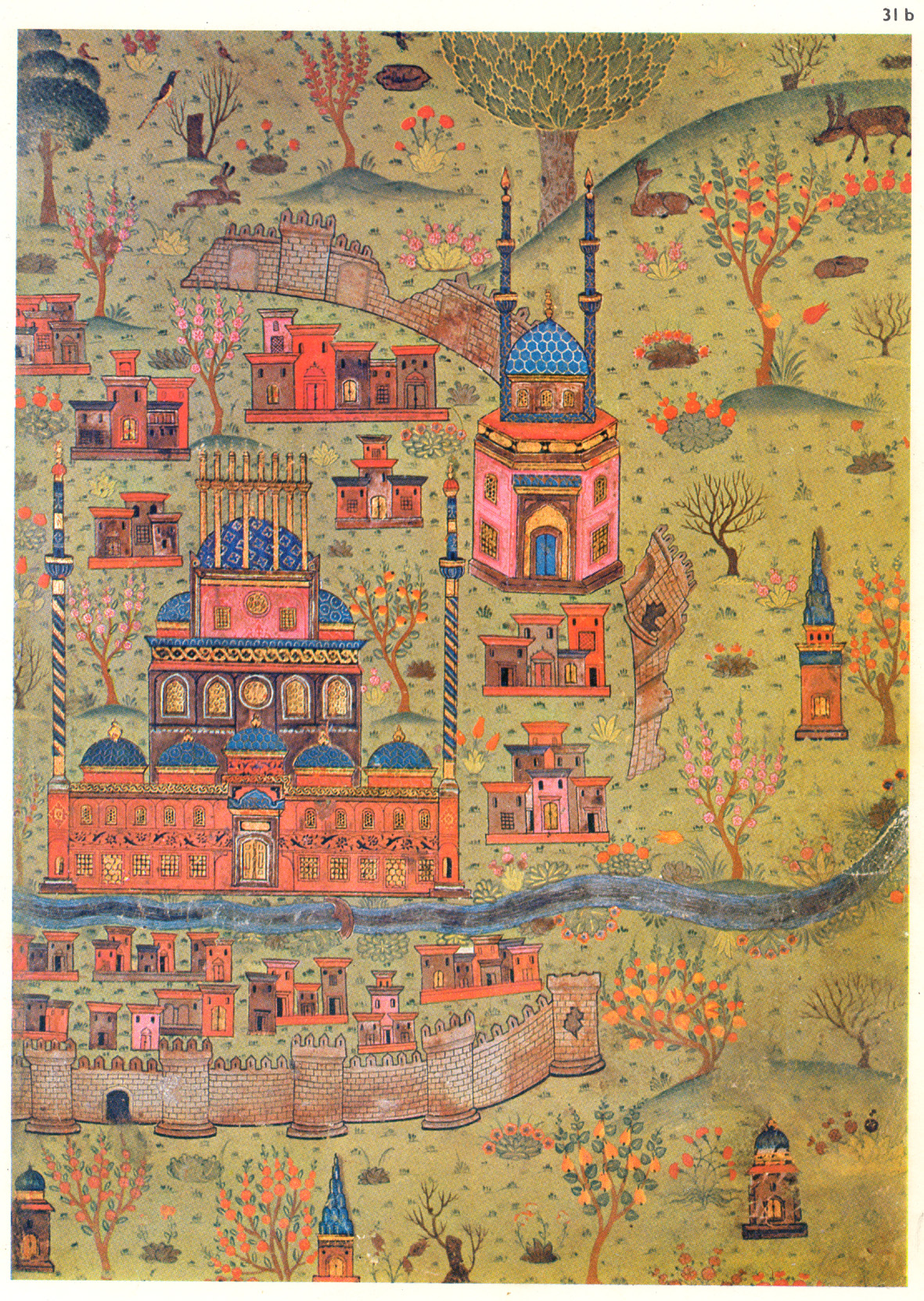
16th century map of Soltaniyeh city

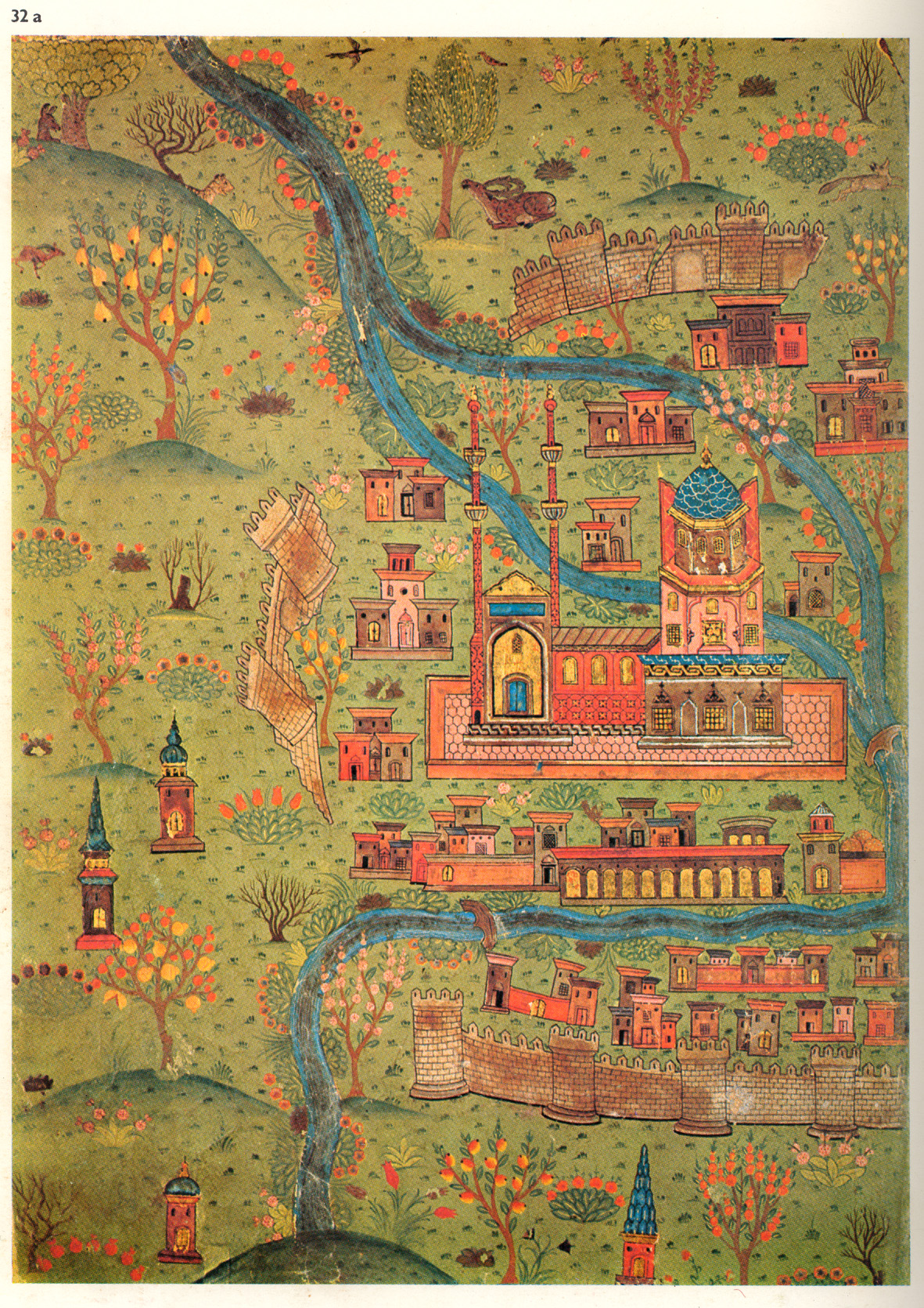
16th century map of Soltaniyeh city

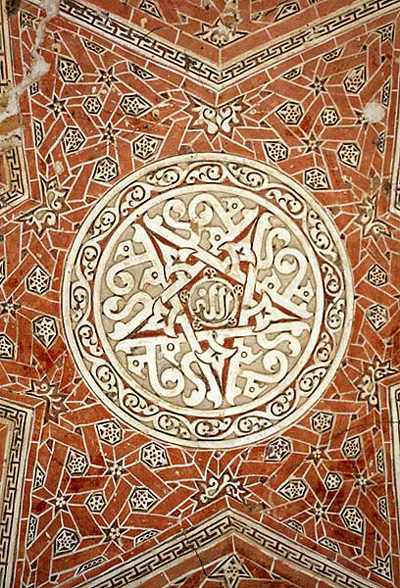
Interior view

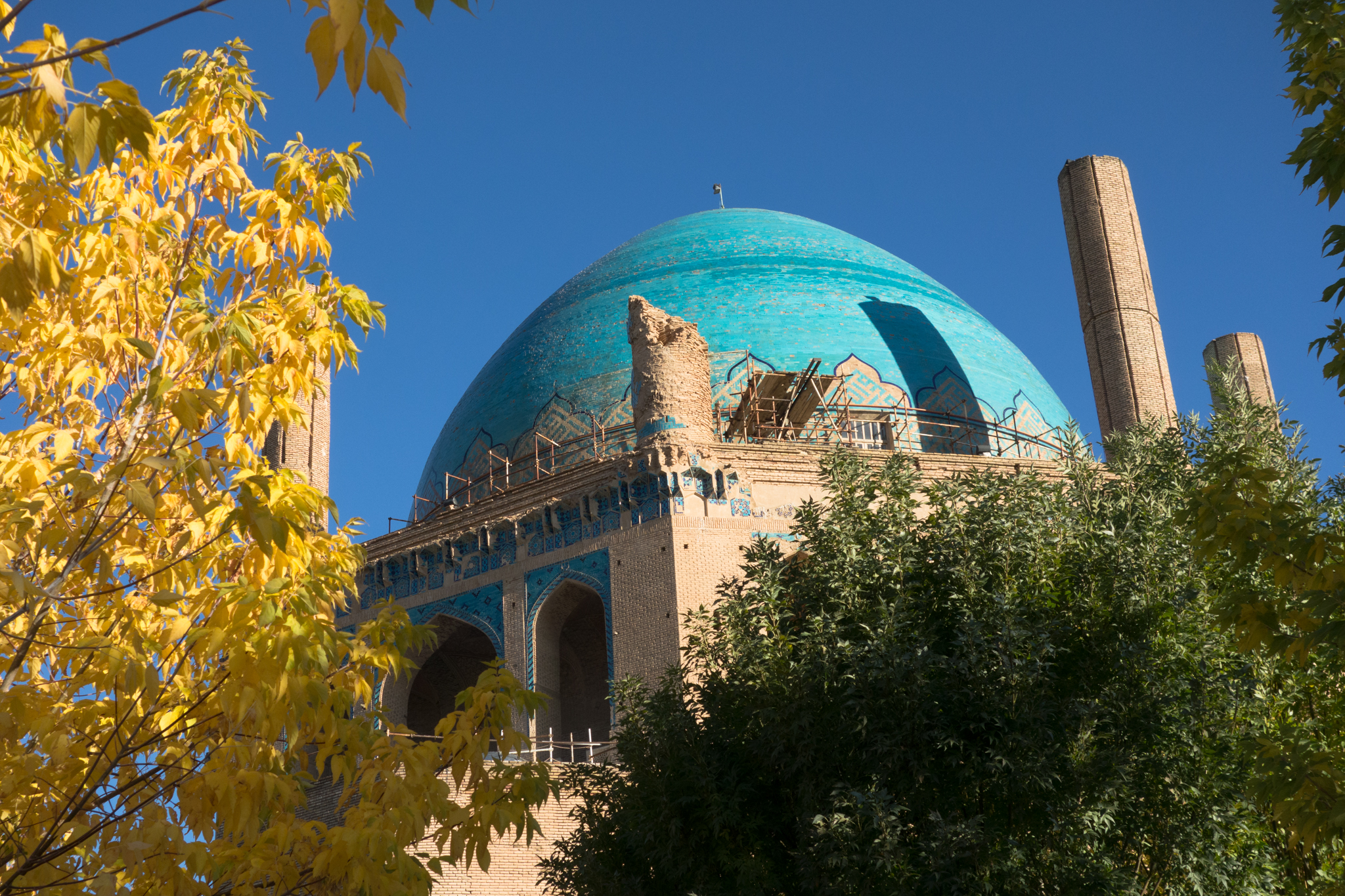
The dome in 2014

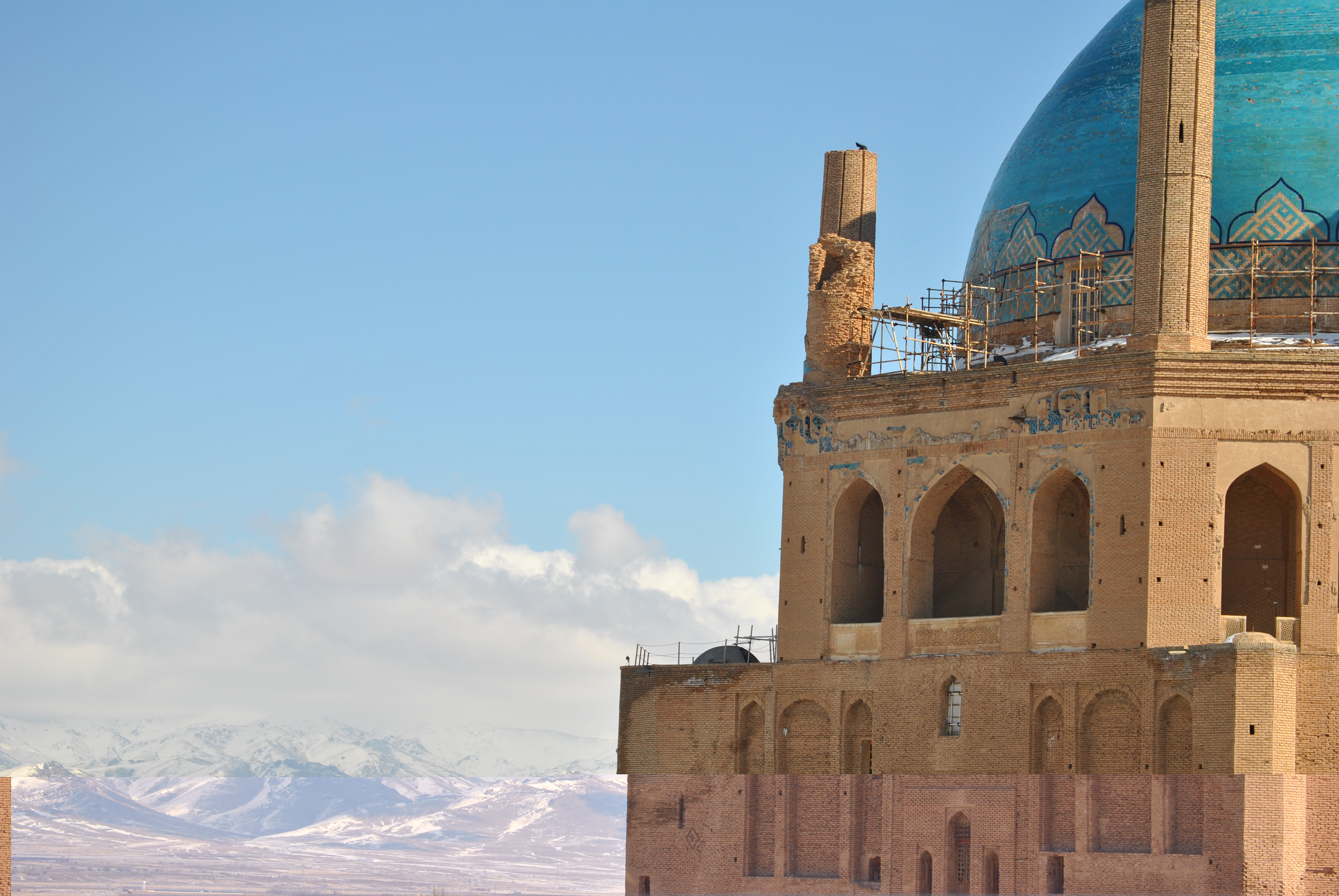
The dome in 2010

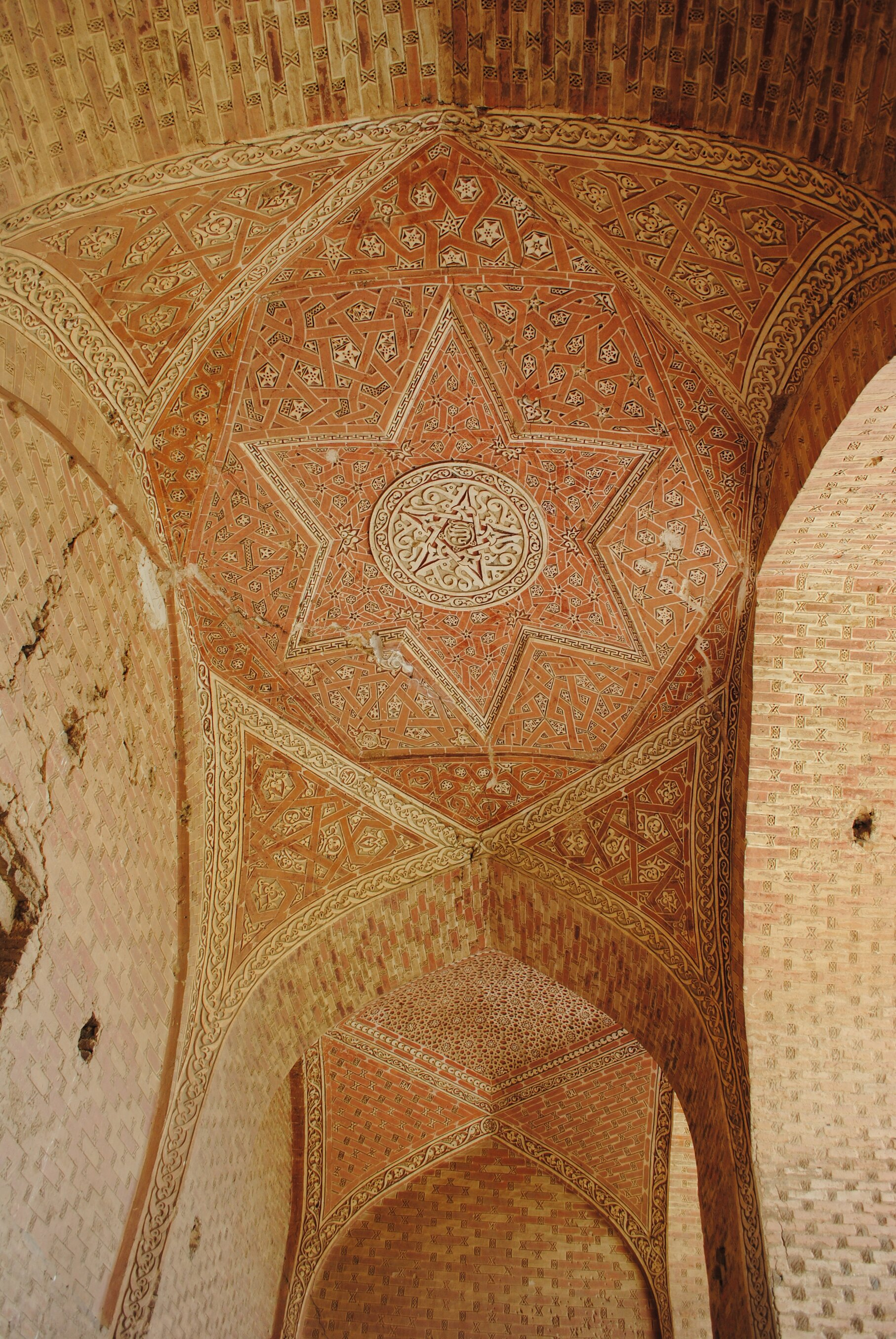
The dome interior 2010

== See also ==
- Persian domes
- List of mausoleums in Iran
