= Ilkhanid architecture =

Era of Iranian architecture

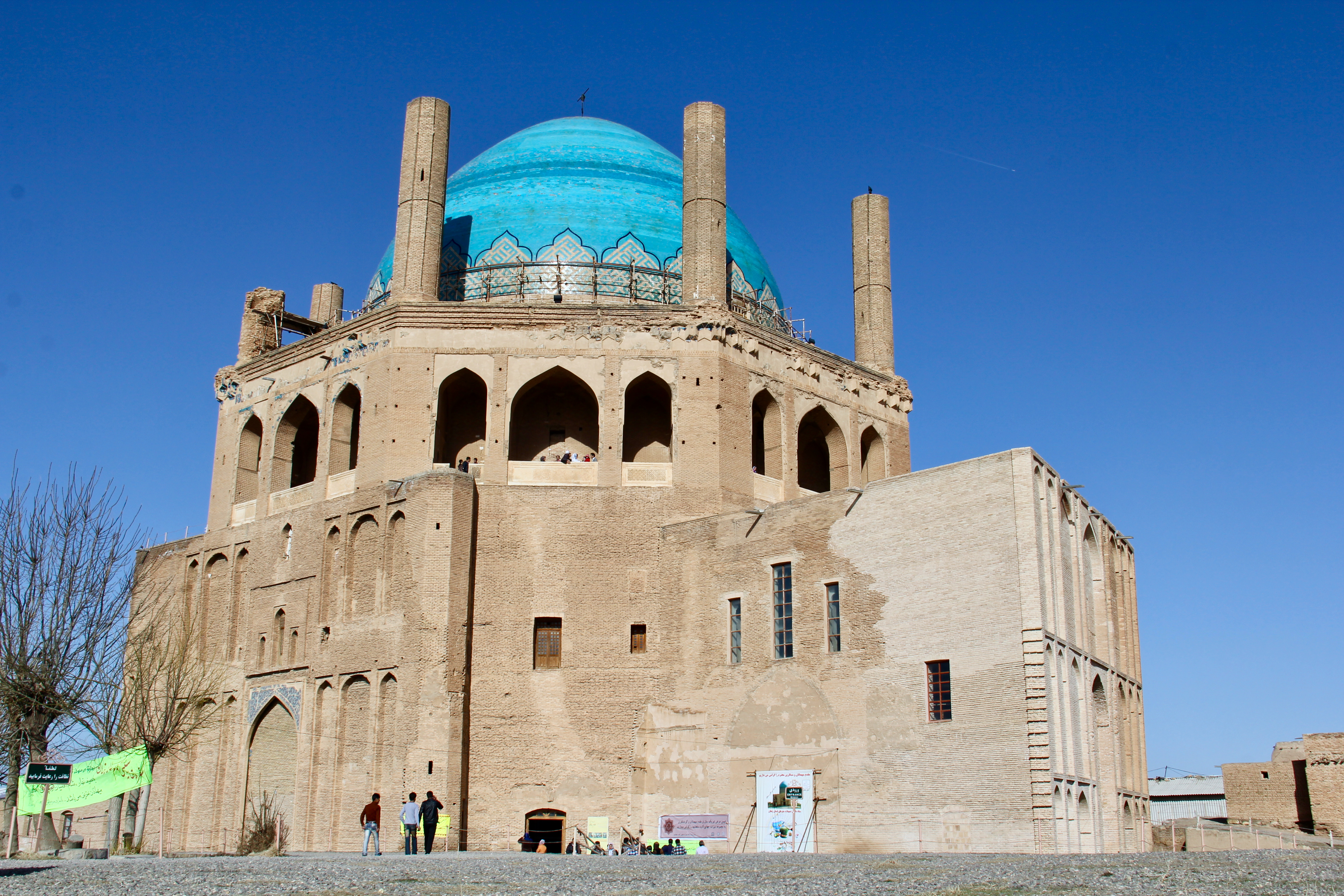
Mausoleum of Uljaytu at Soltaniyeh, Iran (early 14th century)

Ilkhanid architecture was a period in Iranian and Islamic architecture corresponding with the Mongol-ruled Ilkhanate in and around the region of Iran. Architecture in this region and period continued earlier Iranian Islamic features but brought advancements in the design of domed structures and in the production of glazed tile decoration. These developments set the stage for later periods, including Timurid architecture.

== General ==
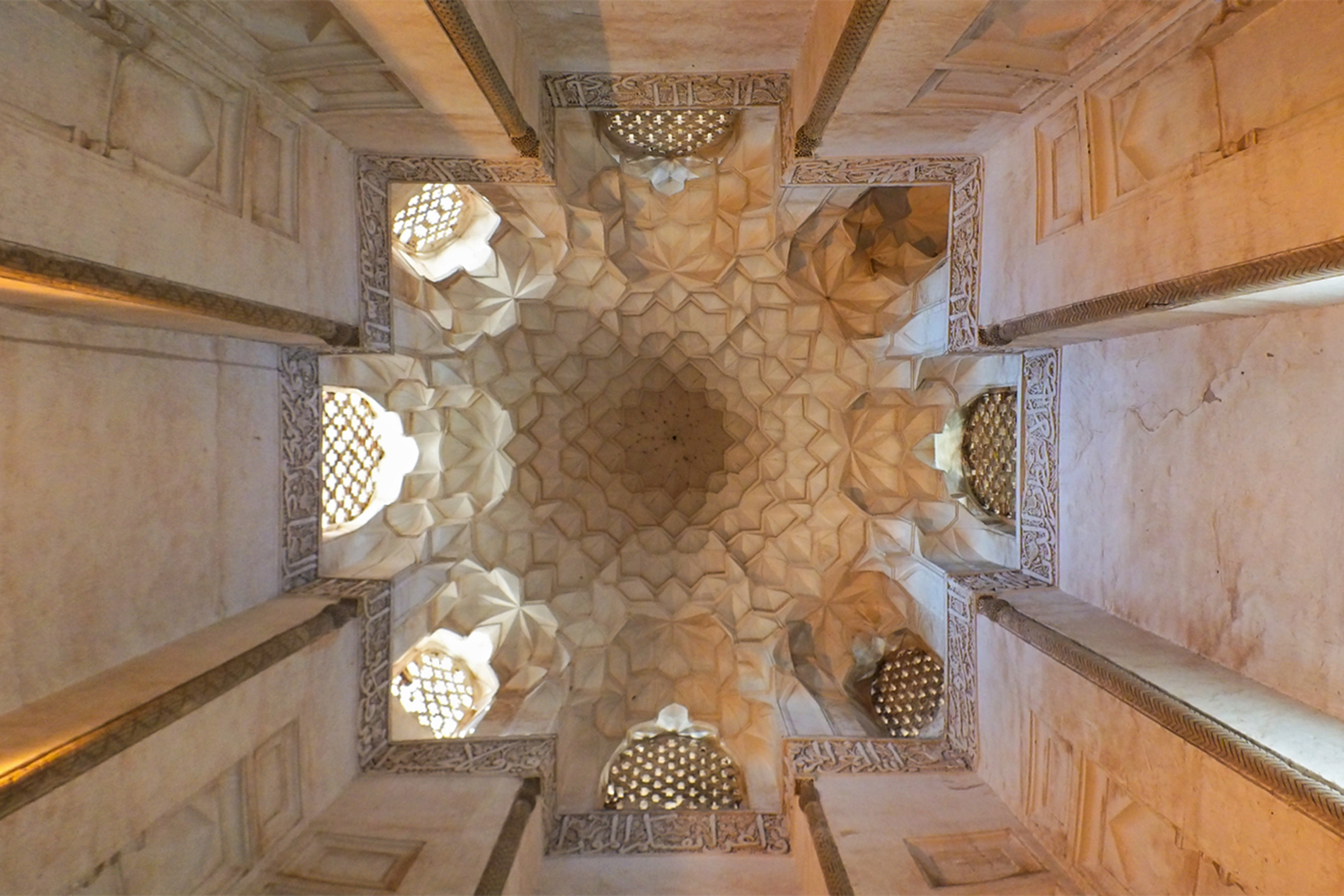
Muqarnas dome inside the Mausoleum of Shaykh 'Abd al-Samad in Natanz, Iran (1307–8)

From the 13th century to the early 16th century, Iran and Central Asia came under the control of two major dynasties descended from the Mongol conqueror Genghis Khan, the Ilkhanids (1256–1353) and the Timurids (1370–1506). This period saw the construction of some of the largest and most ambitious Iranian monuments of the Islamic world. The Ilkhanids were initially traditional nomadic Mongols, but at the end of the 13th century, Ghazan Khan (r. 1295–1304) converted to Islam and aided a cultural and economic resurgence in which urban Iranian culture was of primary importance. Ilkhanid vassals, like the Muzaffarids and the Jalayirids, also sponsored new constructions.

Ilkhanid architecture elaborated earlier Iranian traditions. In particular, greater attention was given to interior spaces and how to organize them. Rooms were made taller, while transverse vaulting was employed and walls were opened with arches, thus allowing more light and air inside. Muqarnas, which was previously confined to covering limited transitional elements like squinches, was now used to cover entire domes and vaults for purely decorative effect. The Tomb of 'Abd al-Samad in Natanz (1307–8), for example, is covered inside by an elaborate muqarnas dome that is made from stucco suspended below the pyramidal vault that roofs the building.

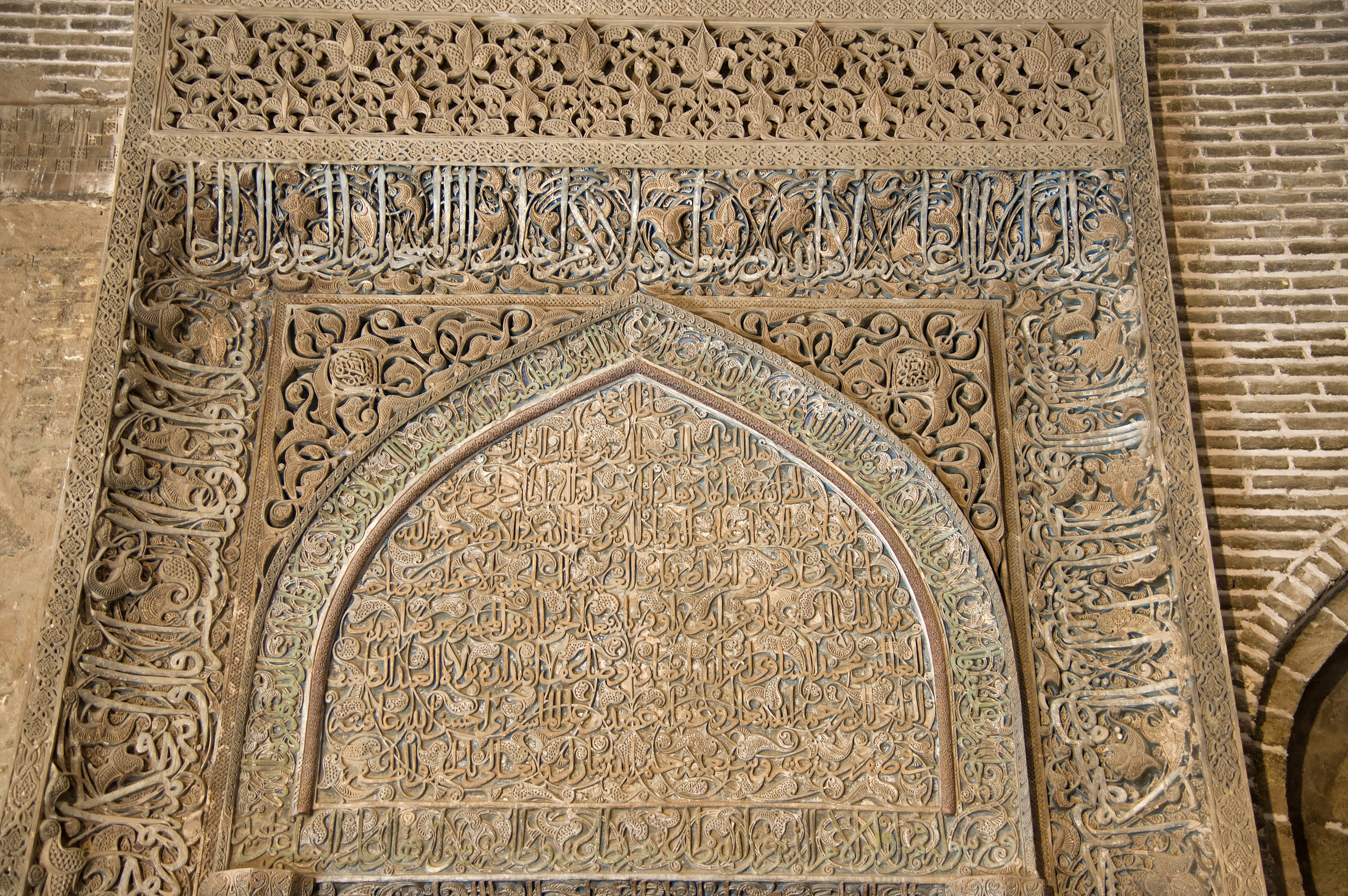
Details of the carved stucco mihrab added by the Ilkhanids in 1310 to the Jameh Mosque in Isfahan, Iran

Brick remained the main construction material, but more color was added through the use of tile mosaic, which involved cutting monochrome tiles of different colors into pieces that were then fitted together to form larger patterns, especially geometric motifs and floral motifs. Carved stucco decoration also continued. Some exceptional examples in Iran come from this period, including a wall of carved stucco in the Mausoleum of Pir-i Bakran in Linjan (near Isfahan), and a mihrab added in 1310 to the Jameh Mosque of Isfahan. The latter is one of the masterpieces of Islamic sculptural art from this era, featuring multiple layers of deeply carved vegetal motifs, along with a carved inscription.

== Palaces and civil buildings ==
The Ikhans commissioned various urban design and expansion projects the Azerbaijan region, including the cities of Maragha, Tabriz, and Soltaniyeh. Apart from these urban projects, the Ilkhans continued to reside in the countryside with elaborate tents of considerable size and expensive fabrication. Other facilities were also set up in temporary tent structures, including mosques. These and other fragile structures have not survived.

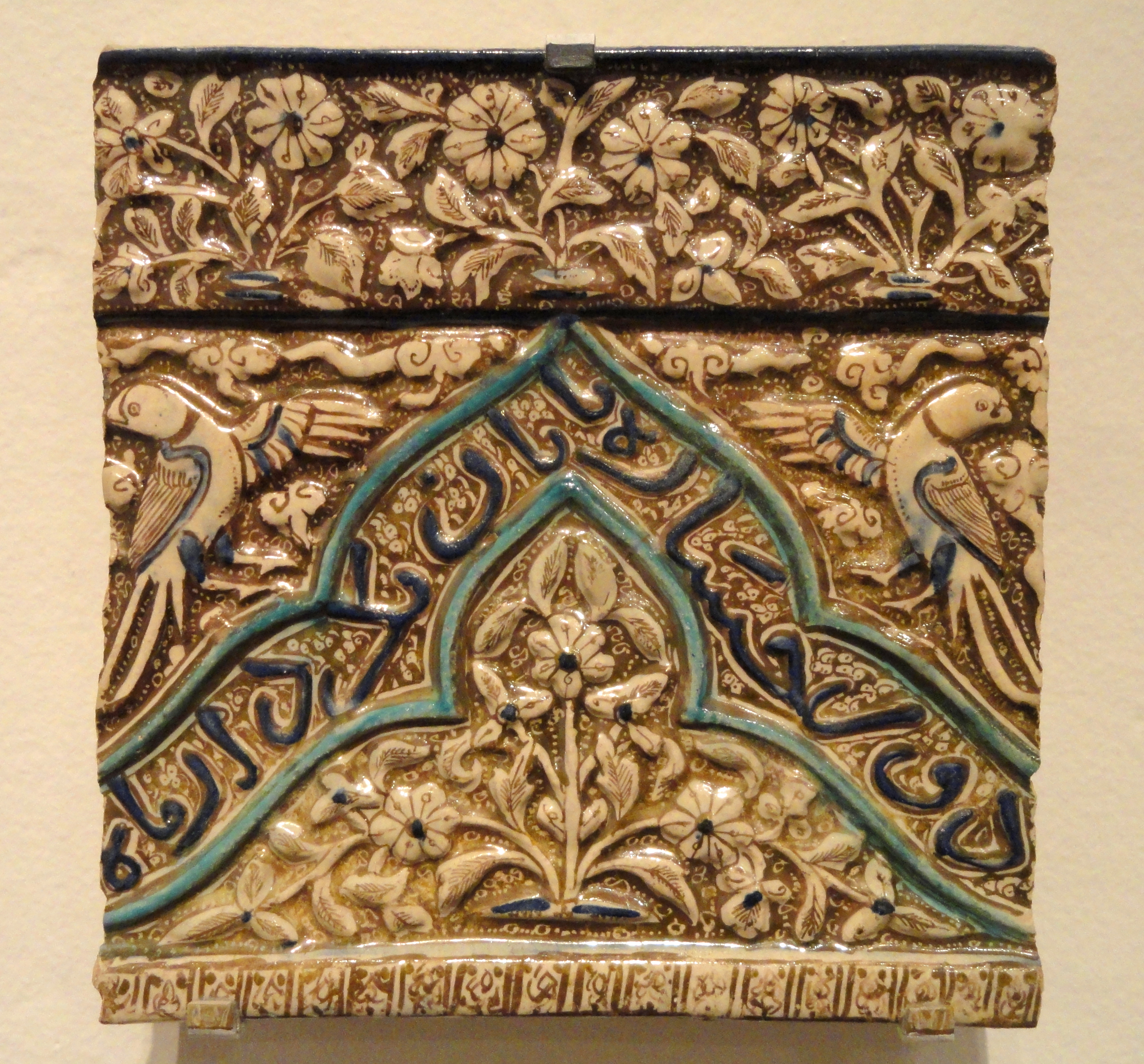
Glazed tile from Takht-e Soleyman, Iran (late 13th century)

One of the earliest structures for which remains have been found are an astronomical observatory built by Hulegu in 1258 in Maragha. Built of brick and decorated with tiles, it had a large central tower hosting a quadrant. Abaqa (r. 1265–1282) built a palace complex over the remains of an ancient Zoroastrian fire temple in Takht-e Soleyman (or Takht-i Sulaymān), the ruins of the former Sasanian temple of Shiz. Though now ruined, it is the only Ilkhanid palace for which there are still physical remains. One of the main structures featured a courtyard with a central pool surrounded by galleries and four iwans, one of which led to a large domed hall, possibly the throne room, on the site of the former temple. Across the courtyard from this was the main residence. The site has also yielded many examples of lavishly decorated glazed tiles, some of which were painted with scenes and references to the Shahnameh, the Persian epic poem. Other decoration found among the remains included carved marble.

Arghun (r. 1284–1291) created a new district in Tabriz, called Shanb, which Ghazan then further developed. It contained many shrines, tombs (including that of Ghazan), and an astronomical observatory built under Ghazan. The vizier Rashid al-Din, one of the most important cultural figures of the Ilkhanate, also built another religious and charitable district or complex in Tabriz that included a mosque, a madrasa, a hospital, and other services.

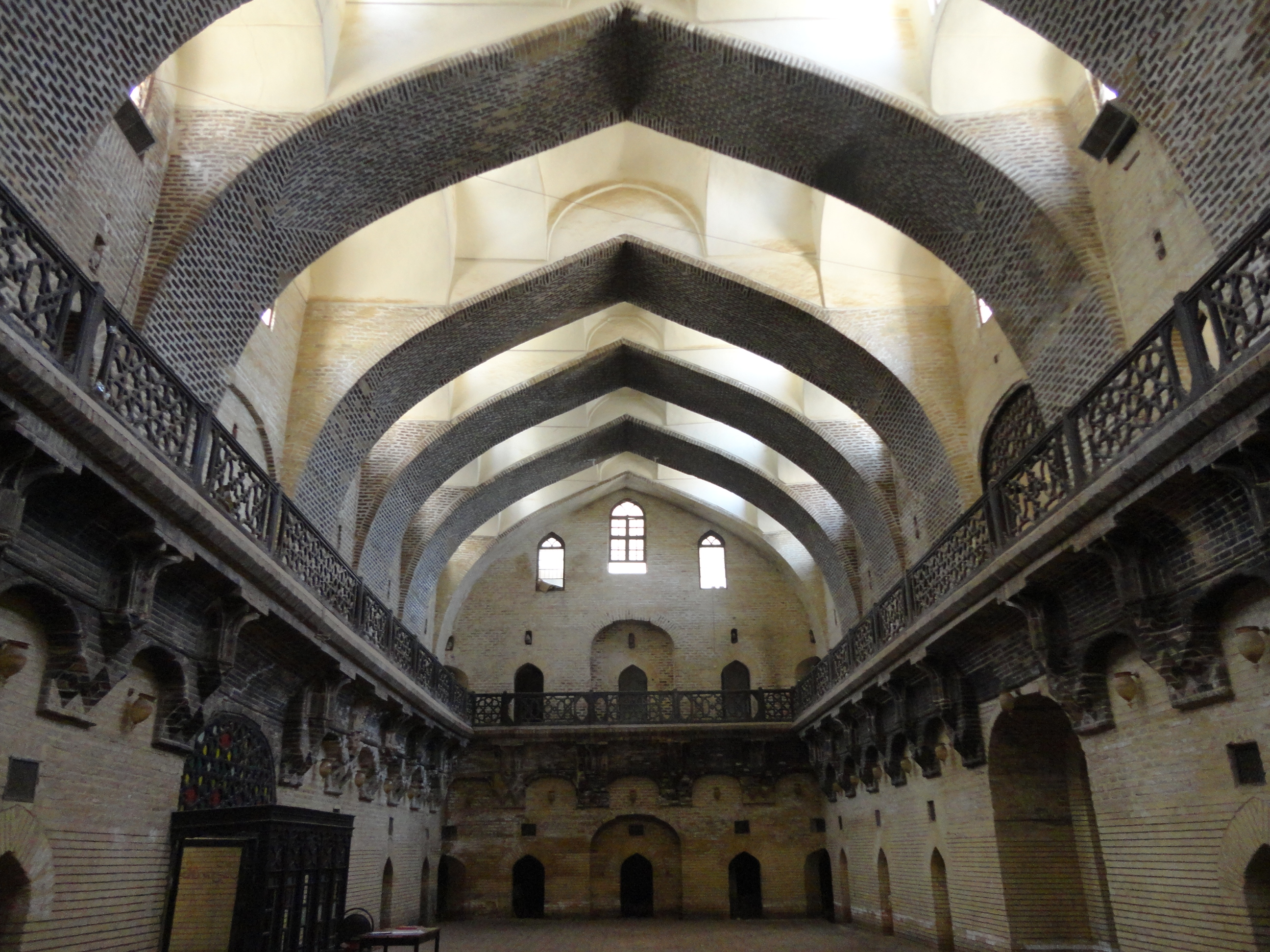
Khan al-Mirjan in Baghdad, Iraq, dated to 1359, is also the oldest surviving urban caravanserai in the Islamic world

Sultaniyya, initially called Qonqur Öleng by the Mongols, was founded by Arghun and then transformed by his son Uljaytu (r. 1304–1317) into a new capital with its current name. Near here, Arghun also began construction on a rock-cut complex that combined traditional Islamic architecture with Buddhist-influenced decoration.

Caravanserais were built throughout the realm again, as in previous periods, although the Khan al-Mirjan in Baghdad is the only surviving example. It features a large rectangular central hall covered by a complex ceiling of eight transverse arches supporting vaults that culminates in domes with squinches, along with windows to allow light from outside. Lesser remains of caravanserais have been found in the countryside, indicating they were rectangular structures with entrance portals and bastions projecting from the outer walls.

== Mosques and madrasas ==
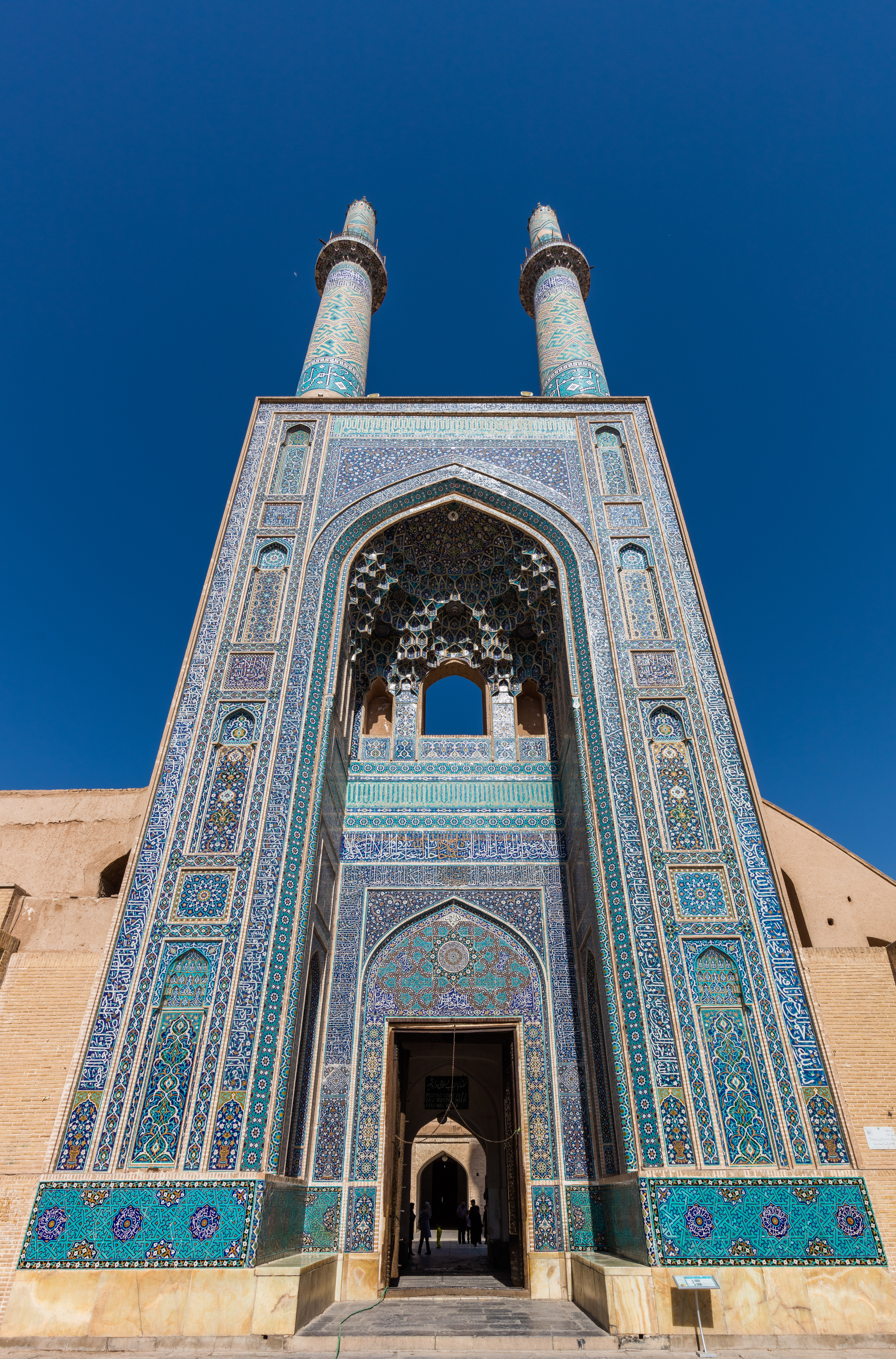
Entrance portal with muqarnas vaulting, twin minarets, and tile decoration at the Jameh Mosque of Yazd, Iran (14th century)

Various mosques were built or expanded during this period, usually following the four-iwan plan for congregational mosques (e.g. at Varamin and Kirman), except in the northwest, where cold winters discouraged the presence of an open courtyard, as at the Jameh Mosque of Ardabil (now ruined). The iwan on the qibla side (in the direction of prayer), usually led to a domed prayer hall behind. Another hallmark of the Ilkhanid period is the introduction of monumental mosque portals topped by twin minarets, as seen at the Jameh Mosque of Yazd.

Aside from mosques, madrasas and khanqahs were also built, again following the four-iwan layout. A significant example is the Madrasa al-Imami in Isfahan, dating to 1354.

== Tombs ==
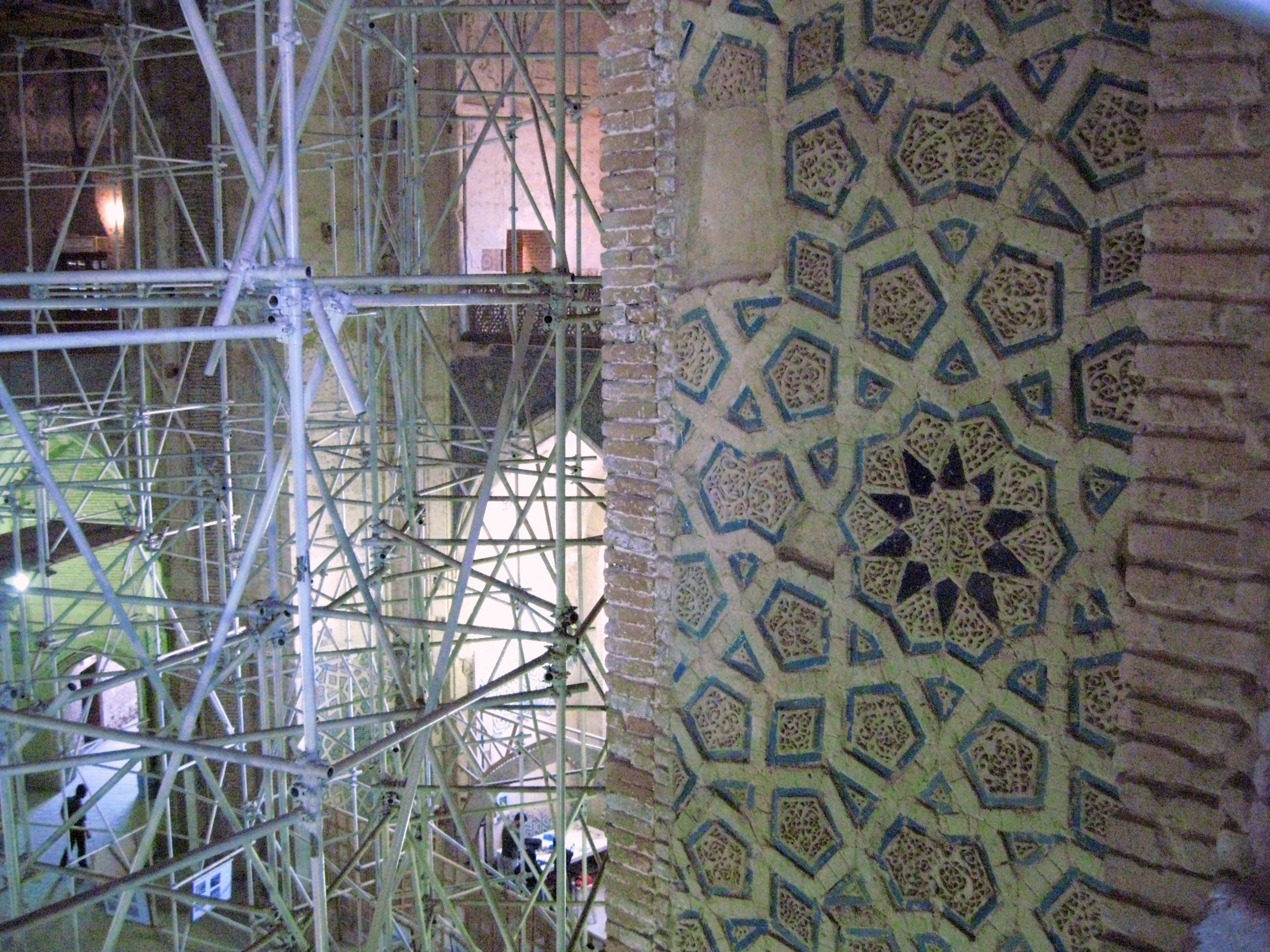
Interior of the Sultaniyya (Soltaniyeh) Mausoleum, under restoration (2007 photo)

The first Muslim tomb of Ilkhanid rulers was the Ghazan Mausoleum in Tabriz. The most impressive monument to survive from this period is the Sultaniyya (or Soltaniyeh) Mausoleum built for Sultan Uljaytu, sometime between 1307 and 1313. It consists primarily of a massive dome supported on a multi-level octagonal structure with internal and external galleries. Only the domed building remains today, missing much of its original turquoise tile decoration, but it was once the centerpiece of a larger religious complex including a mosque, a hospital, and living areas.

The dome of Uljaytu's mausoleum measures almost 25 metres (82 ft) in diameter and about 50 metres (160 ft) high, making it the largest dome in historical Iranian architecture, the largest domed space at the time of its construction, and still one of the largest brick domes in the world today. Its thin, double-shelled construction was reinforced by arches between the shells. The addition of an external vaulted gallery wrapping around the upper part of the building was a feature that would be further developed in later periods and ultimately be perfected in the Taj Mahal.

Smaller tombs and shrines in honour of local Sufis were also built or renovated by Ilkhanid patrons, such as the shrine of Bayazid Bastami in the town of Bastam, the aforementioned Mausoleum of Pir-i Bakran, and the aforementioned Tomb of Abd-al-Samad. Also in Bastam, the Ilkhanids built a traditional tower tomb to house the remains of Uljaytu's infant son. Unusually, rather than being an independent structure, the tomb was erected behind the qibla wall of the town's main mosque – a configuration also found in some contemporary Mamluk architecture.
