= Jameh Mosque of Zavareh =

Mosque in Zavareh, Isfahan, Iran

- مسجد جامع زواره
- View of the mosque from outside

- Location of the mosque in Iran

Religion
- Affiliation: Shia Islam
- Ecclesiastical or organisational status: Friday mosque
- Status: Active

Location
- Location: Zavareh, Isfahan province
- Country: Iran
- Coordinates: 33°26′56″N 52°29′30″E

Architecture
- Type: Mosque architecture
- Style: Seljuk
- Completed: 1136 CE; 1159 CE (additions)
- Materials: Bricks; plaster

Iran National Heritage List
- Official name: Friday Mosque of Zavareh
- Type: Friday Mosque
- Designated: 1937
- Reference no.: 283
- Conservation organization: Cultural Heritage, Handicrafts and Tourism Organization of Iran

The Jāmeh Mosque of Zavareh (Persian: مسجد جامع زواره, romanized: Masjed-e-Jāme-e Zavareh, lit. 'Grand Mosque of Zavareh') is a Friday mosque (jāmeh) of the city of Zavareh, in the province of Isfahan, Iran. Zavareh is situated in the Iranian desert in a hot and dry climates, approximately 15 kilometres (9.3 mi) north of Ardestan.

The mosque was added to the Iran National Heritage List on 3 March 1937, administered by the Cultural Heritage, Handicrafts and Tourism Organization of Iran.

== History ==
The mosque was ordered to be constructed by Abu Tahir Husayn ibn Ghali ibn Ahmad. Two dates are associated with this mosque. First, an inscription indicating the date 1135 CE and work of Abu Tahir was found on the courtyard façade and second, an inscription on the eastern side of the south iwan dates the mihrab from 1156. Hence, it is plausible that the mosque was built some time between 1135 and 1156. The mosque is famous for its plan and for its brick and stucco work making it a site of historical and cultural significance to Iran.

The Seljuk mosque plans varied, between being entirely covered by five domes like 11th-century Masjid-i Diggarun or nine domes like the 12th-century Natanz mosque, or a dome chamber with an iwan in front of it like the mosque at Ardabil. Some other plans, like Jāmeh Mosque of Zavareh utilized the four-iwan plan, which in itself can have diversity in scale. The mosque in Zavareh is more of a domestic scale, in comparison to other models with long narrow courtyards or later 16th-century examples with open areas.

== Architecture ==
The Jāmeh Mosque of Zavareh, built of brick, dates from the Seljuk period and is the earliest dated example of a four-iwan plan. This type of plan would continue to be optimized and developed throughout the Muslim world and applied not only to mosques but other types of structures as well, including madrasas, hospitals, and even caravansaries. The origin of this plan is pre-Islamic, each of its components alone: the iwan, iwan-dome combination and court with four iwans can all be traced to pre-Islamic traditions in Iran and Iraq. Hence, the innovation was not in the components of the plan but their arrangement as a court with a side entrance and combining it with four iwans each with different sizes depending on their position in the building.

In this mosque and all other mosques, the largest iwan is the one in front of the qibla dome chamber. The reasons behind the quick adoption of the 4-iwan plan can fall under different hypotheses. Most notably, it was postulated that this type of plan gained popularity for being similar to eastern Iranian private house plans under the so-called madrasa theory, whereby madrasas were sponsored by Seljuq princes and already existing houses were transformed for that purpose; hence the plan continued to be utilized for different purposes and this may explain why it has become widely used in congregational mosques. However, this hypothesis cannot be fully maintained.

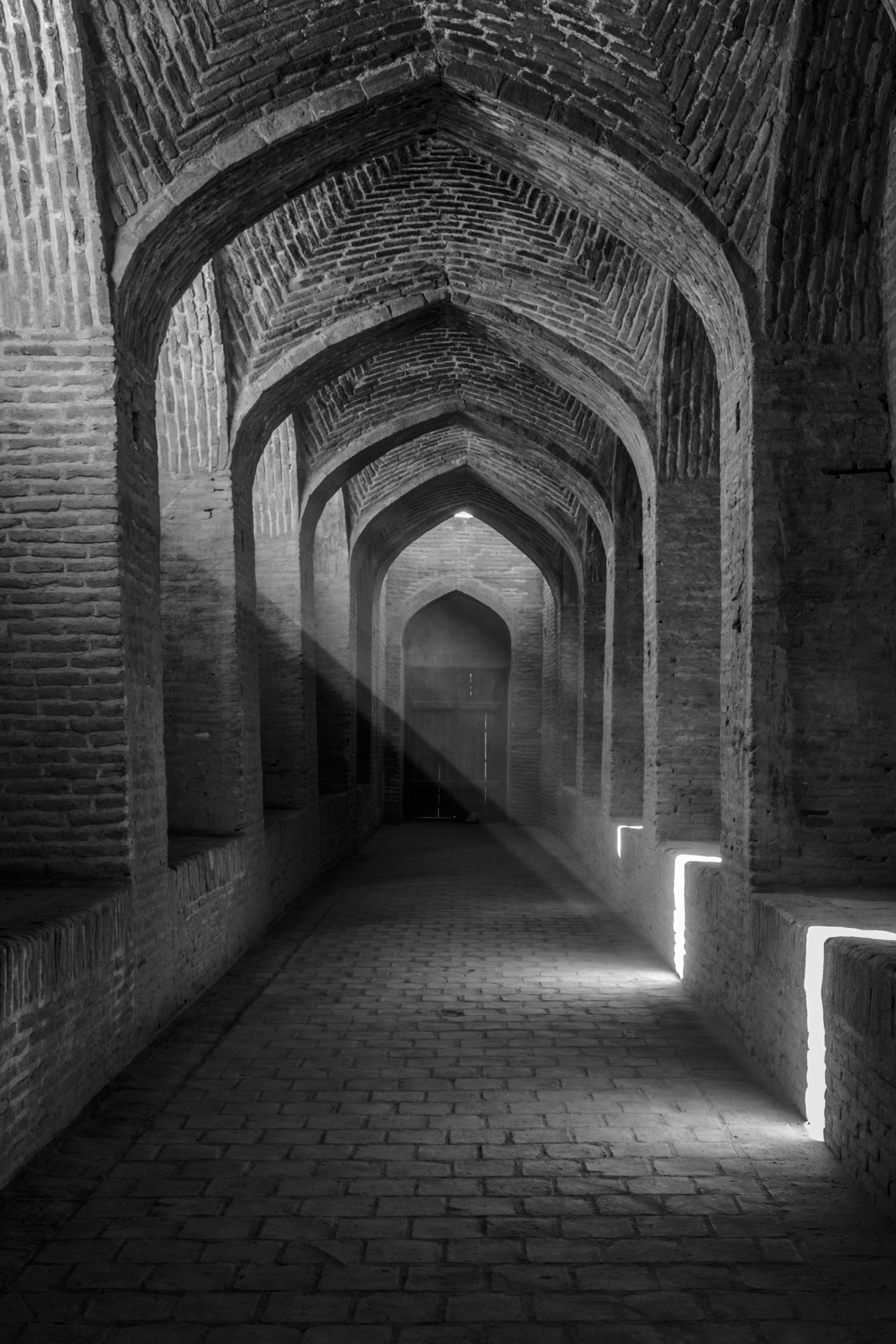
Vaulting

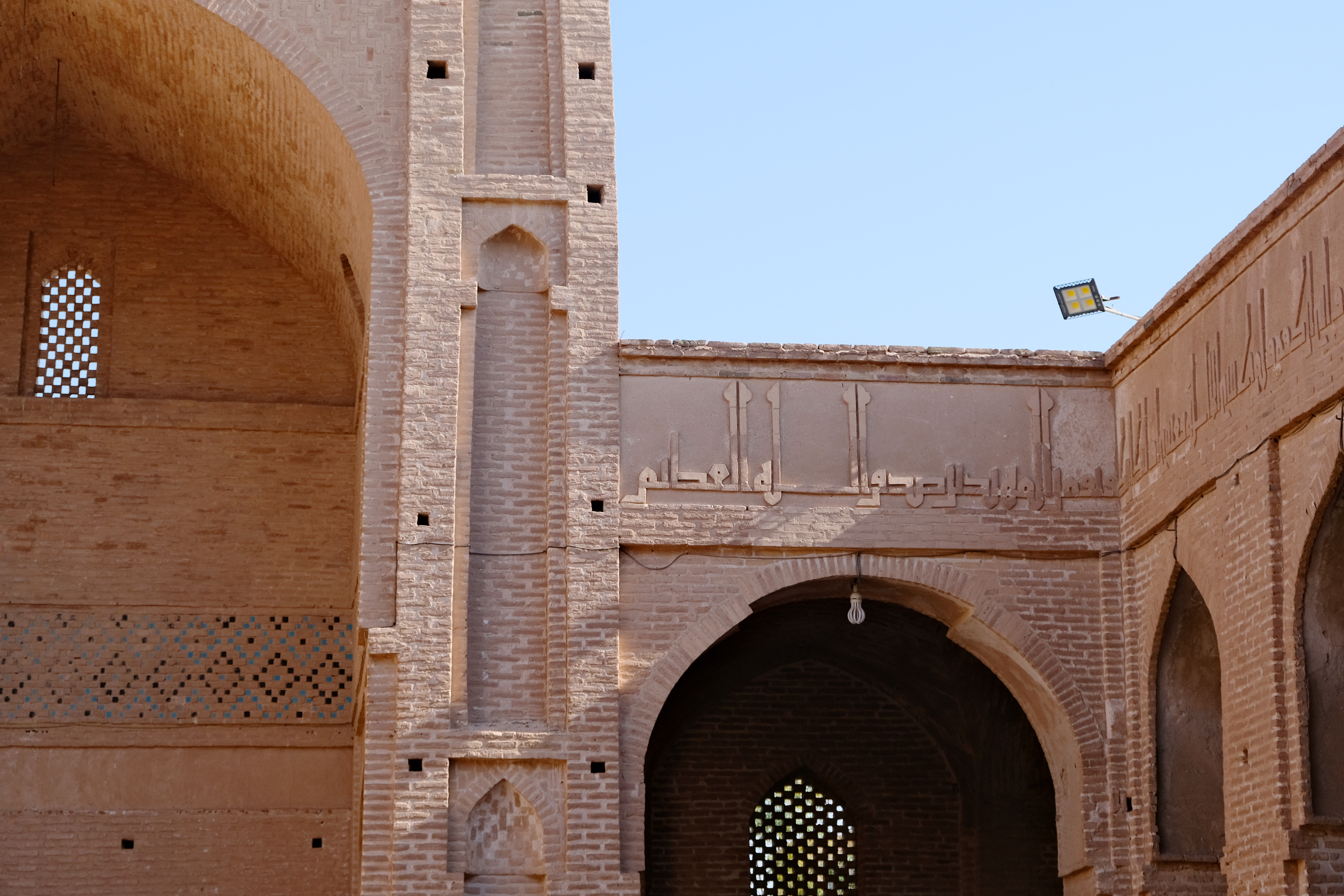
Kufic inscription

The plan of the mosque consists of a rectangular courtyard, with nine bays perpendicular to the qibla and seven bays parallel to it. The arcades within the bays are barrel-vaulted arcades that are perpendicular to the main north-south axis of the building, while octagonal and rectangular piers support the vaults.

The mosque has three entrances, one of which is the main entrance to the public and is located on the north end of the east side while the other two ends are on the west side of the building. On the northwestern side of the mosque, a minaret is situated next to the entrance to the mosque. The minaret has a few glazed elements, but it is relatively scarce, although representing a start of this happening on succeeding minarets.

The square dome chamber located on the qibla side of the mosque has an octagonal zone of transition with a muqarnas squinch which is most likely a direct copy and inspiration from the 11th-century dome-chambers added by Malik-Shah I and his vizier Nizam al-Mulk in the Friday Mosque of Isfahan. The dome is decorated on the inside with different colored bricks intersecting giving cross-patterns. Moreover, the transition zone of the dome is on squinches that imitate those of the Friday Mosque of Isfahan.

While some mosques include dome chambers that were later additions (like the Great Mosque of Isfahan), in the Mosque of Zavareh the dome chamber is contemporary to the building and all its features were built at the same time. The dome has inscriptions in floral Qur’anic Kufic script on a wide border on a wide margin of floral and vine motifs. Although damaged, it is hypothesized from what is remaining that it read Quran 3:16-17:

ٱلَّذِينَ يَقُولُونَ رَبَّنَآ إِنَّنَآ ءَامَنَّا فَٱغۡفِرۡ لَنَا ذُنُوبَنَا وَقِنَا عَذَابَ ٱلنَّارِ (16) ٱلصَّٰبِرِينَ وَٱلصَّٰدِقِينَ وَٱلۡقَٰنِتِينَ وَٱلۡمُنفِقِينَ وَٱلۡمُسۡتَغۡفِرِينَ بِٱلۡأَسۡحَارِ

=== Decoration ===
On some of the soffits inside the mosque, stucco decoration still remains. Some soffits are decorated with a series of arabesques, others are more symmetrical with plain leaf motifs. Although they may have similar types of arabesque, each soffit treats it differently with some containing plain leaves, some with geometric decoration, and some with parallel lines indicating veins on a leaf. This mosque is one of the few monuments in the Kashan area that still possesses an impressive quantity of original stucco, that is monumental and static in its overall appearance.

The rectangular mihrab of the mosque - measuring 4.2 metres (14 ft) wide and 7.3 metres (24 ft) high - is highlighted by both its location and decorative features. It is located close to the main entrance and is highly decorated, making it a great contrast with the interior of the mosque which is relatively plain; it occupies a large area of the qibla wall and reaches as far as the zone of transition. As classified by Shani, the mihrab in Zavareh is classified under a group of stucco that is from Iran and in which the Samarra second style is strongly articulated with compositional elements in its spandrel decoration. As for the decoration of the two lunettes and the top panel in the mihrab, these follow under the Samarran influence where volume and fluency are added to the archaic motifs of the previous classification. The stucco on the mihrab is of very fine quality and is crowned with various leaf forms and vegetation. The mihrab has one arch within another, which is typical of the Iranian Seljuk period. The mihrab has many layers of ornamentation which adds depth and intricacy to the decoration. It consists of the following:

1. Two rectangular epigraphic frames containing two arch niches that are supported on slender pairs of engaged columns, adorned with a wide band of beautiful arabesques and floral motifs.
2. Three inscriptions; the inscription on the outermost frame is in Kufic with a vegetal background, and contains verses from the Quran 17:78-80
  1. أَقِمِ الصَّلَاةَ لِدُلُوكِ الشَّمْسِ إِلَىٰ غَسَقِ اللَّيْلِ وَقُرْآنَ الْفَجْرِ ۖ إِنَّ قُرْآنَ الْفَجْرِ كَانَ مَشْهُودًا
  2. وَمِنَ اللَّيْلِ فَتَهَجَّدْ بِهِ نَافِلَةً لَّكَ عَسَىٰ أَن يَبْعَثَكَ رَبُّكَ مَقَامًا مَّحْمُودًا
  3. وَقُل رَّبِّ أَدْخِلْنِي مُدْخَلَ صِدْقٍ وَأَخْرِجْنِي مُخْرَجَ صِدْقٍ وَاجْعَل لِّي مِن لَّدُنكَ سُلْطَانًا نَّصِيرً
3. The inner rectangular inscription is in thuluth script, and contains Quran 9:18-19:
  1. إِنَّمَا يَعْمُرُ مَسَاجِدَ اللَّهِ مَنْ آمَنَ بِاللَّهِ وَالْيَوْمِ الْآخِرِ وَأَقَامَ الصَّلَاةَ وَآتَى الزَّكَاةَ وَلَمْ يَخْشَ إِلَّا اللَّهَ ۖ فَعَسَىٰ أُولَٰئِكَ أَن يَكُونُوا مِنَ الْمُهْتَدِينَ
  2. أَجَعَلْتُمْ سِقَايَةَ الْحَاجِّ وَعِمَارَةَ الْمَسْجِدِ الْحَرَامِ كَمَنْ آمَنَ بِاللَّهِ وَالْيَوْمِ الْآخِرِ وَجَاهَدَ فِي سَبِيلِ اللَّهِ ۚ لَا يَسْتَوُونَ عِندَ اللَّهِ ۗ وَاللَّهُ لَا يَهْدِي الْقَوْمَ الظَّالِمِينَ
4. The inscription framing the pointed arch of the mihrab, also in Thuluth, is Quran 3:118-189
  1. لَا تَحْسَبَنَّ الَّذِينَ يَفْرَحُونَ بِمَا أَتَوا وَّيُحِبُّونَ أَن يُحْمَدُوا بِمَا لَمْ يَفْعَلُوا فَلَا تَحْسَبَنَّهُم بِمَفَازَةٍ مِّنَ الْعَذَابِ ۖ وَلَهُمْ عَذَابٌ أَلِيمٌ
  2. وَلِلَّهِ مُلْكُ السَّمَاوَاتِ وَالْأَرْضِ ۗ وَاللَّهُ عَلَىٰ كُلِّ شَيْءٍ قَدِيرٌ
5. The spandrels and the tympanum of the arch of the mihrab are decorated with floral decorations, arabesque on a foliated background, and half-palmettes which move in curves.

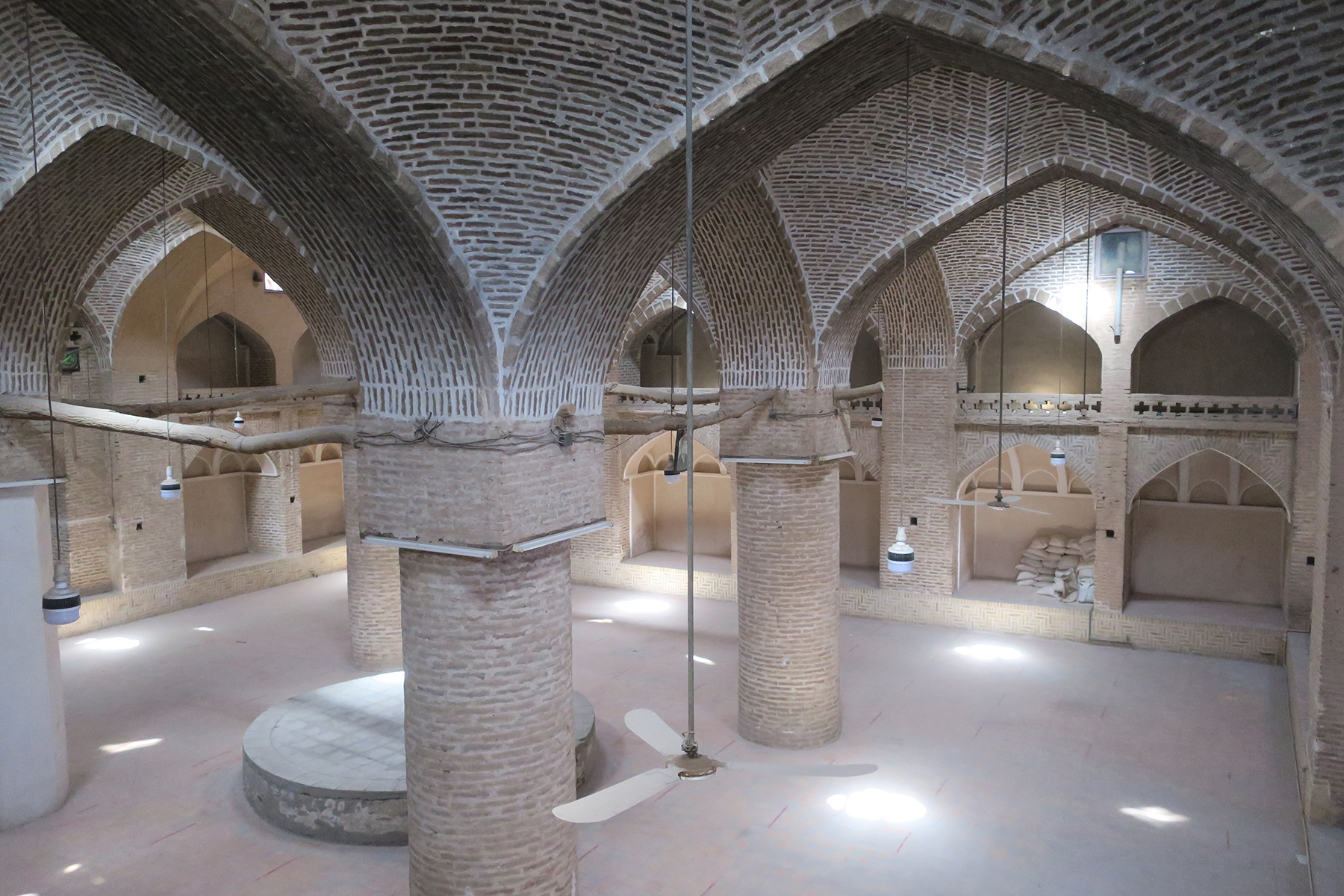
Inside the mosque after restoration

The top of the mihrab is adorned with the words "الملک" and "الله" on which "الملک" is repeated once and "االله" four times; repeating the phrase al-mulk li’llah, Sovereignty is God’s.”

=== Restoration ===
Restoration of the mosque was completed in 2022 with a budget of 2.5 billion rials (US$8,400). It involved strengthening the structure, and repairing the rooftop and flooring.

== See also ==
- Shia Islam in Iran
- List of mosques in Iran
- List of historical structures in Isfahan province
