= Barsian mosque and minaret =

Shi'ite mosque in Barsian, Isfahan, Iran

Barsian mosque and minaret (Jameh Mosque of Bersian)
- مناره و مسجد جامع برسیان
- View of the exterior of the mosque

- Location of the mosque in Iran

Religion
- Affiliation: Shia Islam
- Ecclesiastical or organisational status: Friday mosque
- Status: Active

Location
- Location: Barsian village, Isfahan Province
- Country: Iran
- Coordinates: 32°31′18″N 52°32′01″E

Architecture
- Type: Mosque architecture
- Style: Razi; Seljuk; Safavid
- Completed: Minaret: 1098 CE; Mosque: 1134 CE

Specifications
- Interior area: 3,604 m^{2} (38,790 sq ft)
- Dome: One
- Dome height (outer): 24 m (79 ft)
- Dome dia. (outer): 11 m (36 ft)
- Minaret: One
- Minaret height: 34 m (112 ft)
- Materials: Bricks; mortar; plaster

Iran National Heritage List
- Official name: Mosque and Minaret of Barsian
- Type: Mosque/Minaret
- Designated: 1937
- Reference no.: 265
- Conservation organization: Cultural Heritage, Handicrafts and Tourism Organization of Iran

The Barsian Mosque and Minaret comprise a Shi'ite Friday mosque, also known as the Jameh Mosque of Bersian (Persian: مناره و مسجد جامع برسیان), and 34-metre-high (112 ft) minaret, located in the village of Barsian, (Note: Barsian was originally called Parsian.) approximately 42 kilometres (26 mi) east of Esfahan, in the province of Isfahan, Iran.

The mosque and minaret were added to the Iran National Heritage List on 3 March 1937, administered by the Cultural Heritage, Handicrafts and Tourism Organization of Iran.

== Overview ==
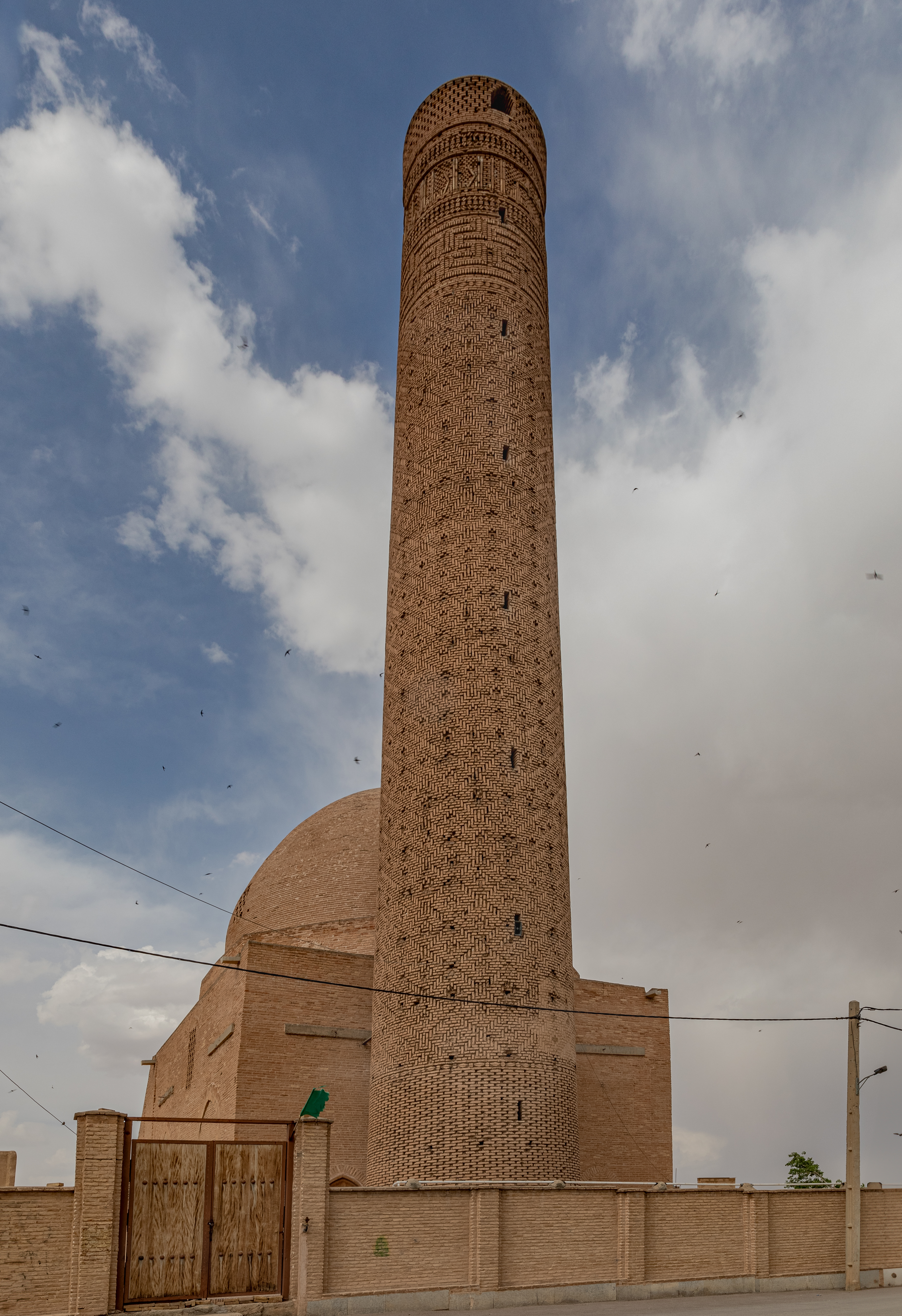
The imposing minaret

According to the inscriptions, the minaret and mosque were built in 1098 CE and between 1105 CE and 1134 CE respectively, during the reign of Sultan Barkiyaruq of the Seljuk dynasty.

The minaret is the fourth oldest minaret with an inscription, located in Iran. The bottom part of the minaret is completed in simple brickwork, whilst the upper part uses more decorative bricks.

The Barsian Mosque has masterly brickwork, a notable mihrab and beautiful stuccoes. The brick decorations of the mosque and the cover of its dome are very similar to the Taj ol-molk dome in the Jameh Mosque of Isfahan and some believe that the Barsian Mosque had the same architect. In the era of Tahmasp I, a sahn and an iwan were added to the northern side of the mosque. The sahn and iwan were completed during the 16th century.

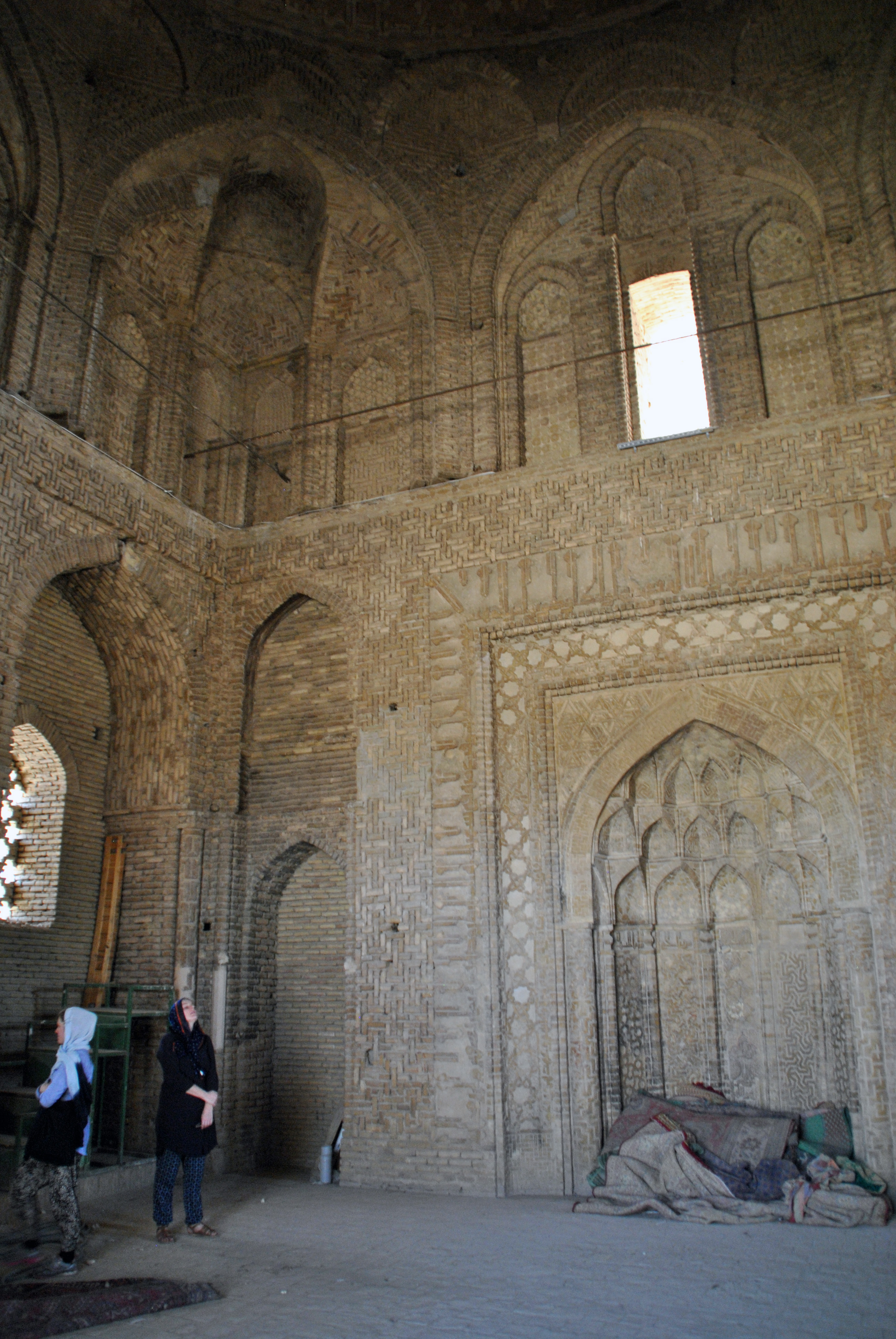
Interior with Mihrab and Squinch transition

== Gallery ==
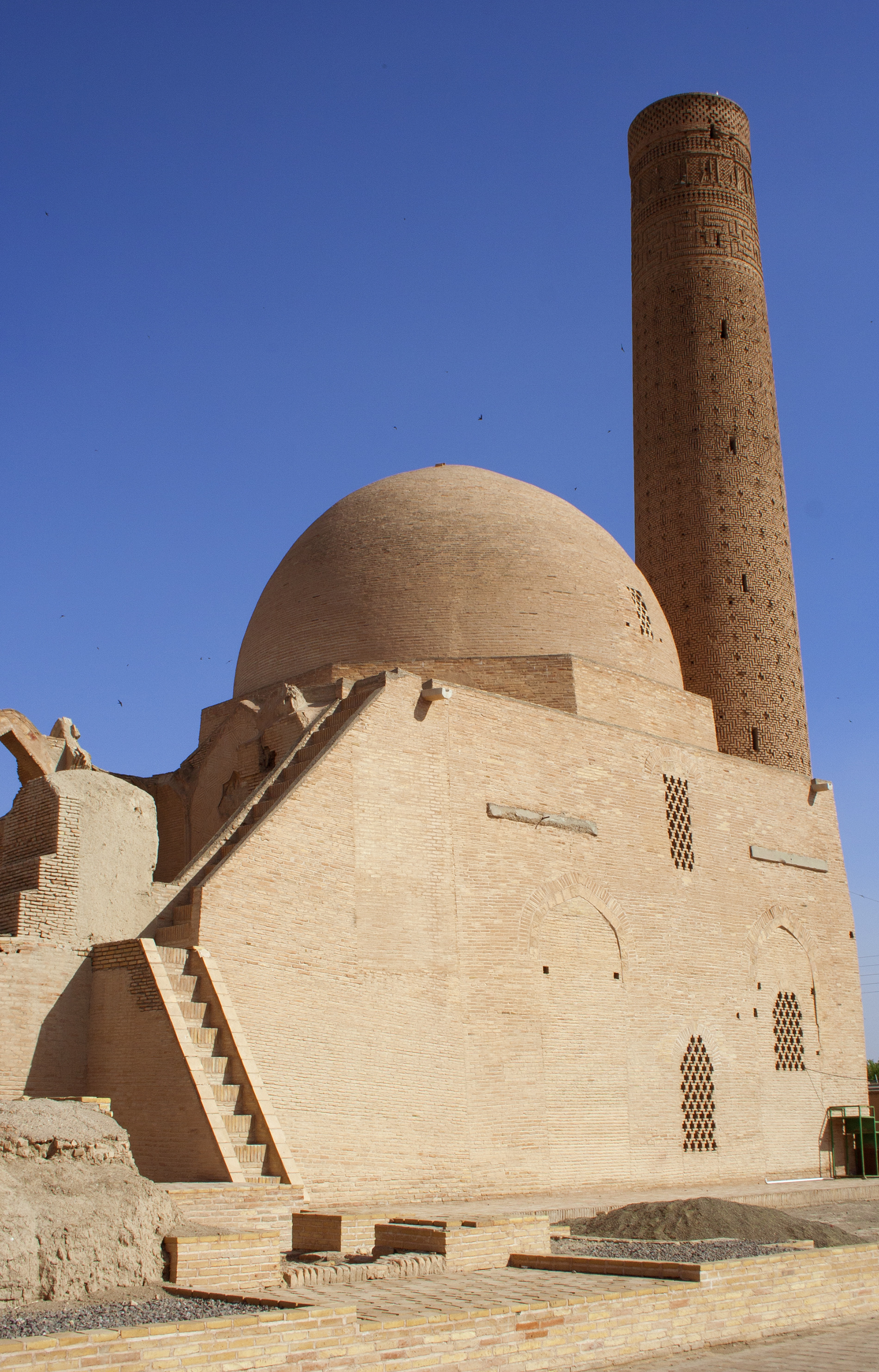
The mosque dome and minaret

== See also ==
- Shia Islam in Iran
- List of mosques in Iran
- List of historical structures in Isfahan province
