= Jameh Mosque of Ardestan =

Mosque in Ardestan, Isfahan, Iran

- مسجد جامع اردستان
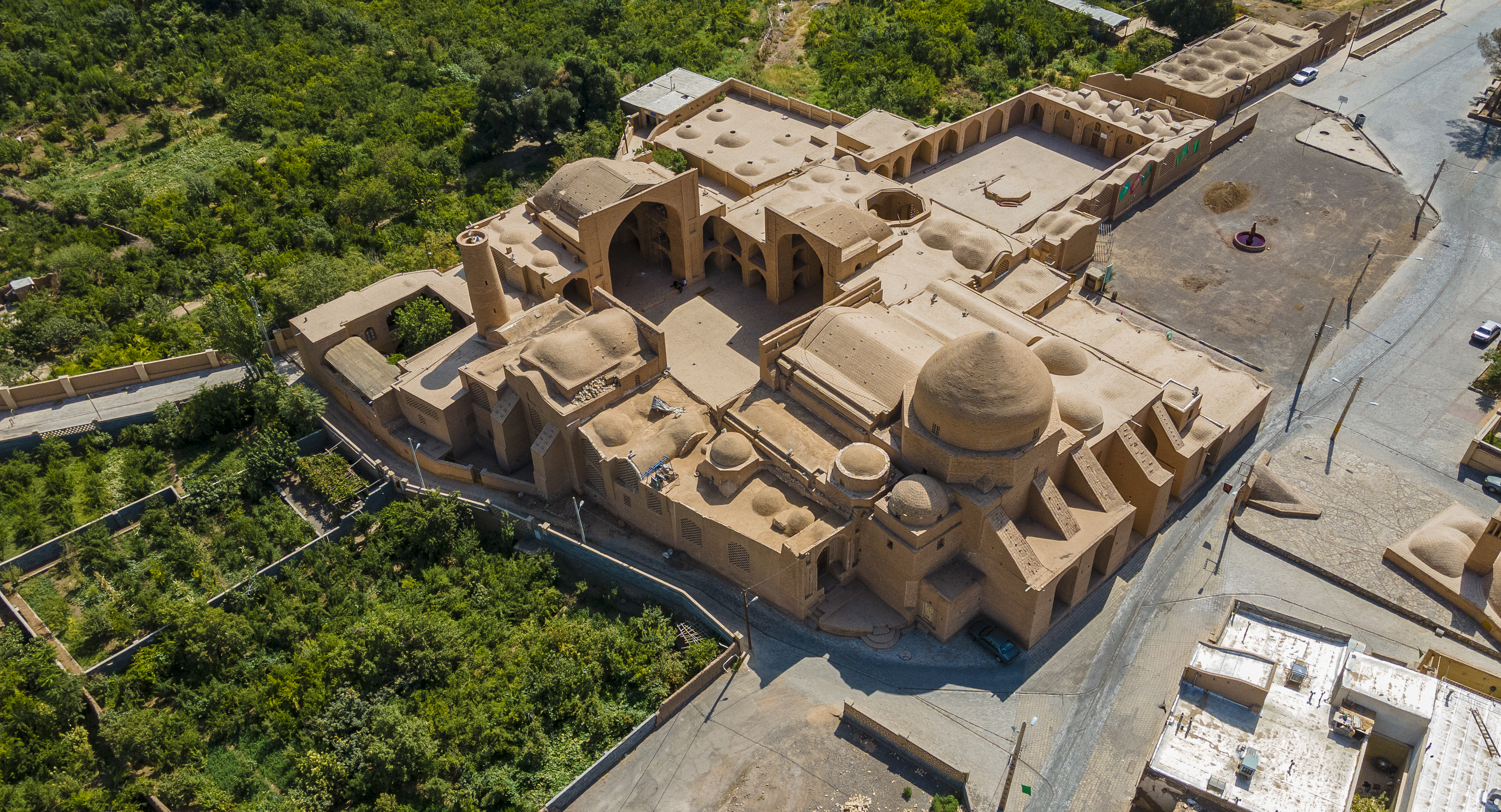

- Location of the mosque in Iran

Religion
- Affiliation: Shia Islam
- Ecclesiastical or organisational status: Friday mosque
- Status: Active

Location
- Location: Ardestan, Ardestan County, Isfahan province
- Country: Iran
- Interactive map of Jameh Mosque of Ardestan
- Coordinates: 33°22′29″N 52°21′57″E

Architecture
- Type: Mosque architecture
- Style: Abbasid (prime); Seljuk (dome); Safavid (iwans, renov.)
- Completed: 9th century CE (prime); 1158 (dome); 1160 (iwan, south); 1539 (iwan, north); 1567 (iwan, north, renov.); 1615 (iwan, south, renov.); 17th century (iwan, east, west); 1980 (renovation)

Specifications
- Dome: One (maybe more)
- Materials: Bricks; plaster

Iran National Heritage List
- Official name: Friday Mosque of Ardestan
- Type: Friday Mosque
- Designated: 1932
- Reference no.: 180
- Conservation organization: Cultural Heritage, Handicrafts and Tourism Organization of Iran

The Jāmeh Mosque of Ardestan (Persian: مسجد جامع اردستان, romanized: Masjid-e Jāmeh Ardestan) is a Shi'ite Friday mosque (jāmeh) in Ardestan, Isfahan province, Iran.

The oldest parts indicate a pre-Seljuk building, and it is possible the mosque was built on the site of a Chahartaq. The structure was incorporated in a Seljuk kiosk mosque in the 12th century CE, and further expanded to the classical four-iwan plan. The stucco decoration of the mihrab was altered during the Ilkhanate.

The mosque was added to the Iran National Heritage List on 9 July 1932, administered by the Ministry of Cultural Heritage, Tourism and Handicrafts.

== Gallery ==
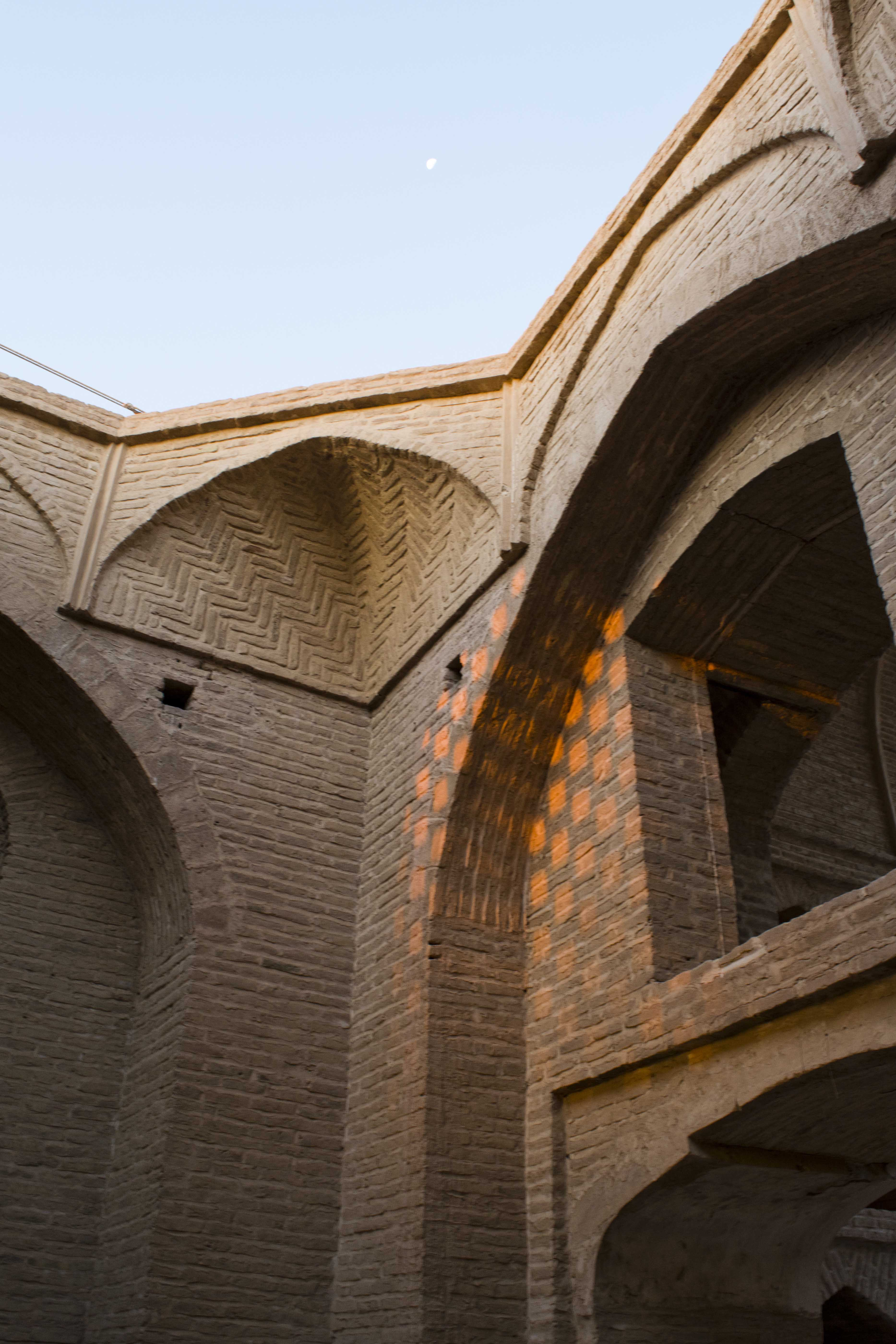

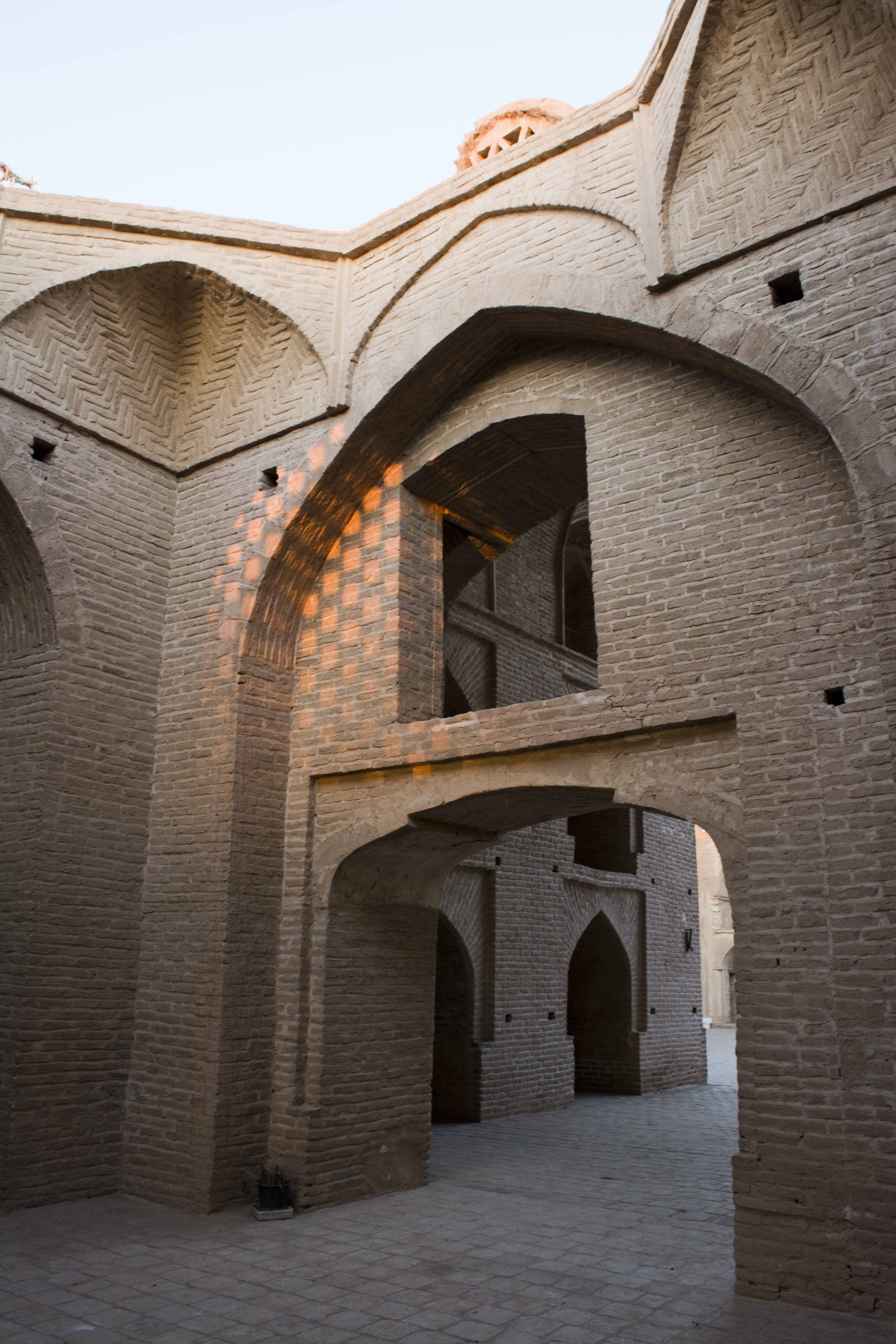

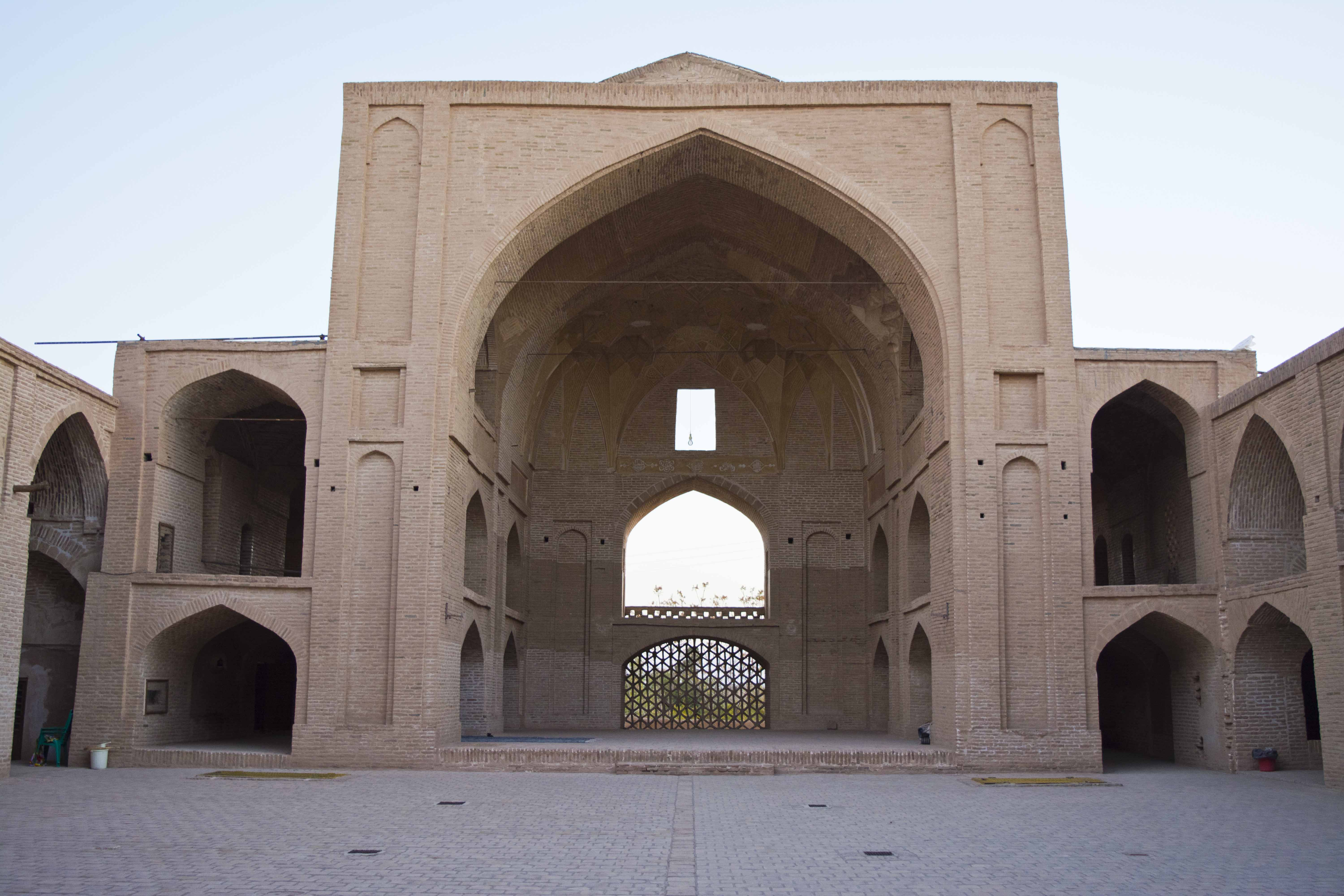

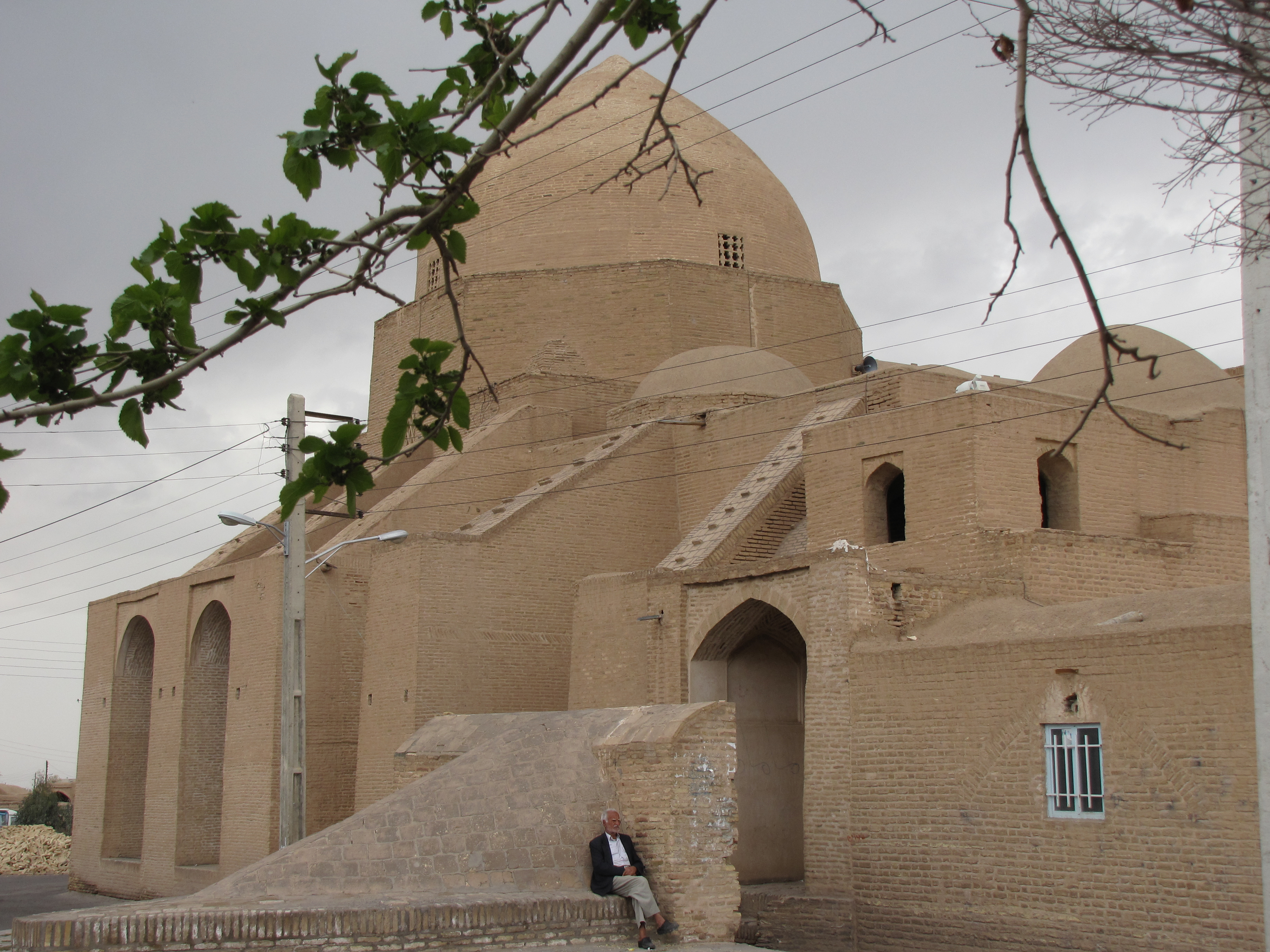

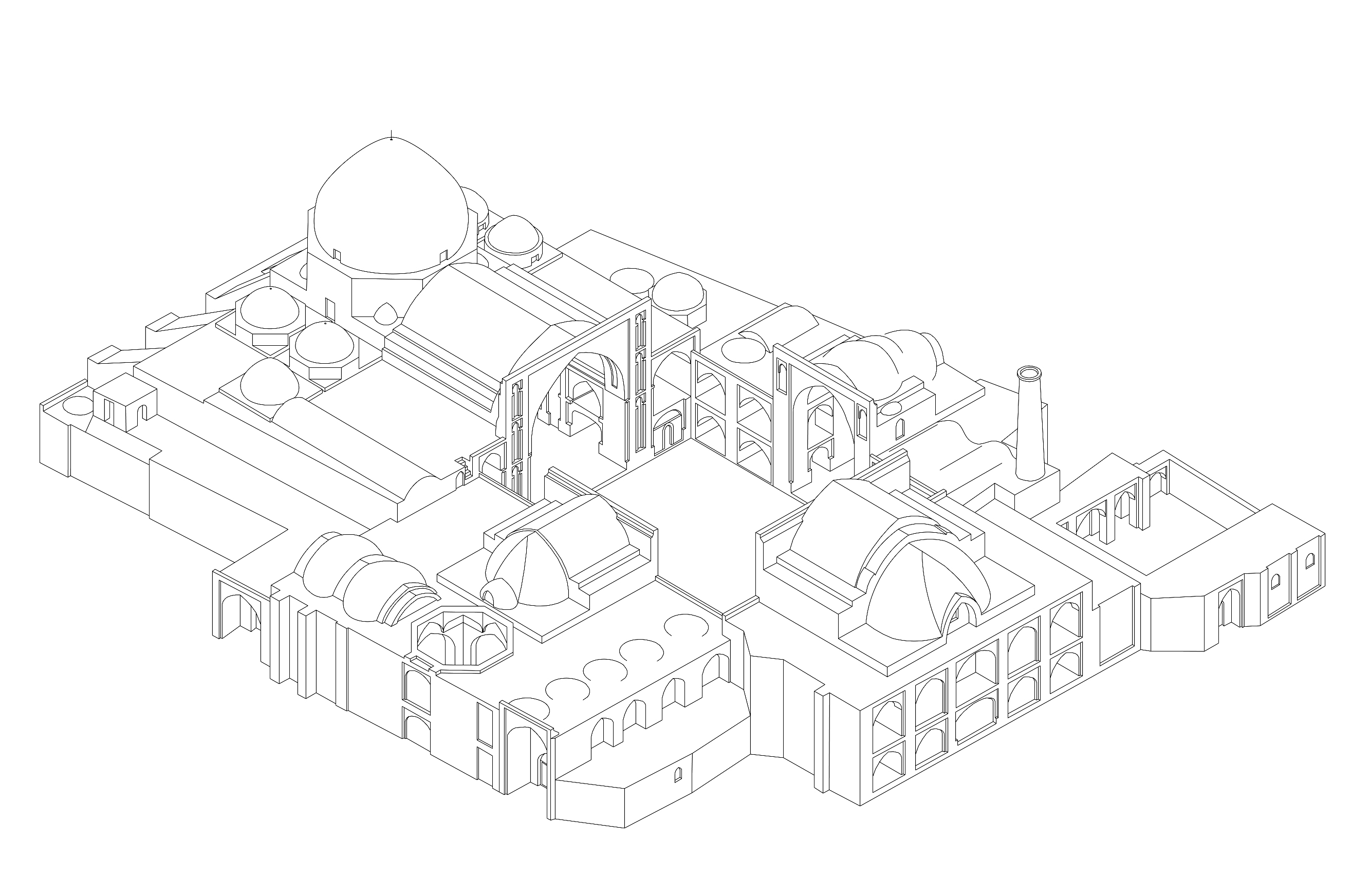

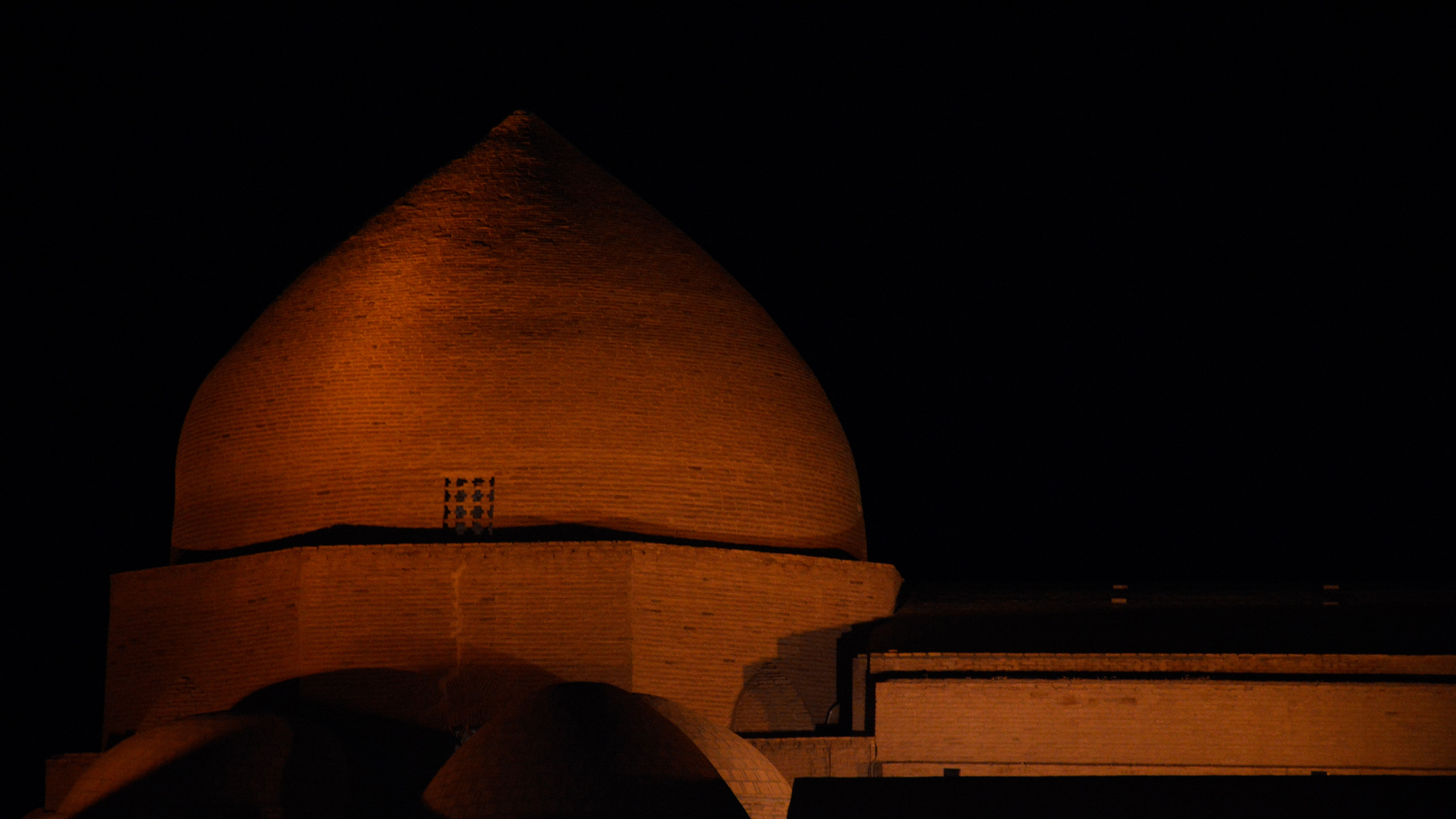

== See also ==
- Shia Islam in Iran
- List of mosques in Iran
