= Ardestan =

City in Isfahan province, Iran

Ardestan Persian: اَردِستان
- City
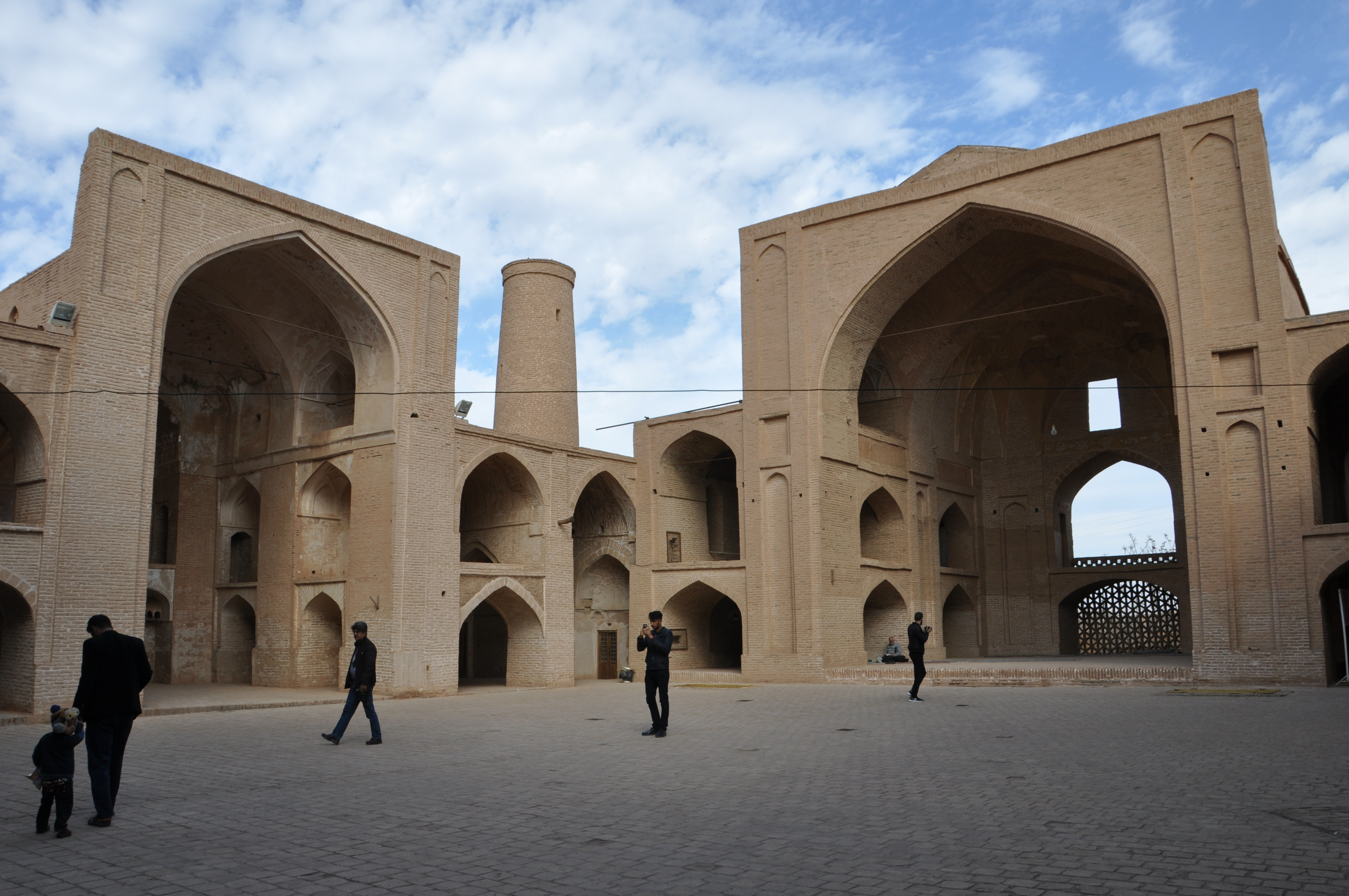
- Jameh Mosque of Ardestan

- Location within Iran
- Coordinates: 33°22′23″N 52°22′08″E
- Country: Iran
- Province: Isfahan
- County: Ardestan
- District: Central

Population (2016)
  - Total: 15,744
- Time zone: UTC+3:30 (IRST)

Ardestan (Persian: اردستان) (Note: Also romanized as Ardestān; also known as Ardistān) is a city in the Central District of Ardestan County, Isfahan province, Iran, serving as capital of both the county and the district.

== Demographics ==
=== Population ===
At the time of the 2006 National Census, the city's population was 14,698 in 4,077 households. The following census in 2011 counted 15,701 people in 4,680 households. The 2016 census measured the population of the city as 15,744 people in 5,093 households.

== Overview ==
Ardestan is located at the southern foothills of the Karkas mountain chain and is 110 km northeast of Isfahan. It is believed the city was founded in Sassanian times and was strongly fortified in the 10th century. A Seljuk-era mosque, a bazaar, several ab anbars, and historical houses of the old town are among the tourist attractions of Ardestan.

Mulberry, pomegranates, and a special kind of fig are the main orchard products of the town.

== Climate ==
Ardestan has a hot desert climate (Köppen: BWh).

Climate data for Ardestan, Esfahan Province, Altitude: 1252.4 M from: 1992-2010
| Month | Jan | Feb | Mar | Apr | May | Jun | Jul | Aug | Sep | Oct | Nov | Dec | Year |
|---|---|---|---|---|---|---|---|---|---|---|---|---|---|
| Record high °C (°F) | 22.2 (72.0) | 26.4 (79.5) | 32.0 (89.6) | 34.4 (93.9) | 39.6 (103.3) | 43.2 (109.8) | 44.4 (111.9) | 43.4 (110.1) | 39.6 (103.3) | 34.2 (93.6) | 29.4 (84.9) | 22.6 (72.7) | 44.4 (111.9) |
| Mean daily maximum °C (°F) | 9.1 (48.4) | 13.3 (55.9) | 18.4 (65.1) | 24.8 (76.6) | 30.2 (86.4) | 35.8 (96.4) | 38.2 (100.8) | 37.3 (99.1) | 33.0 (91.4) | 26.4 (79.5) | 17.6 (63.7) | 11.2 (52.2) | 24.6 (76.3) |
| Daily mean °C (°F) | 4.6 (40.3) | 8.1 (46.6) | 12.9 (55.2) | 19.0 (66.2) | 24.0 (75.2) | 29.4 (84.9) | 31.9 (89.4) | 30.8 (87.4) | 26.7 (80.1) | 20.7 (69.3) | 12.7 (54.9) | 6.8 (44.2) | 19.0 (66.1) |
| Mean daily minimum °C (°F) | 0.1 (32.2) | 2.8 (37.0) | 7.4 (45.3) | 13.2 (55.8) | 17.9 (64.2) | 22.9 (73.2) | 25.6 (78.1) | 24.4 (75.9) | 20.4 (68.7) | 15.1 (59.2) | 7.7 (45.9) | 2.4 (36.3) | 13.3 (56.0) |
| Record low °C (°F) | −15.2 (4.6) | −8.4 (16.9) | −5.2 (22.6) | 1.2 (34.2) | 5.8 (42.4) | 13.0 (55.4) | 18.2 (64.8) | 15.8 (60.4) | 10.5 (50.9) | 6.6 (43.9) | −3.0 (26.6) | −10.2 (13.6) | −15.2 (4.6) |
| Average precipitation mm (inches) | 24.1 (0.95) | 15.1 (0.59) | 23.1 (0.91) | 15.5 (0.61) | 13.3 (0.52) | 0.9 (0.04) | 0.4 (0.02) | 0.9 (0.04) | 0.5 (0.02) | 2.0 (0.08) | 8.9 (0.35) | 22.4 (0.88) | 127.1 (5.01) |
| Average snowy days | 3.1 | 1.3 | 0.5 | 0.0 | 0.1 | 0.0 | 0.0 | 0.0 | 0.0 | 0.0 | 0.0 | 1.1 | 6.1 |
| Average relative humidity (%) | 52 | 41 | 33 | 29 | 24 | 19 | 19 | 17 | 18 | 26 | 38 | 51 | 31 |

== Historical sites ==
- Imamzadeh Husayn: This Seljuk imamzadeh possibly made part of a Seljuk madrasah. Only little of this structure remains today. A badly damaged portal with the remains of a minaret (originally two) can still be found.
- Imamzadeh Ismael
- Jameh Mosque of Ardestan: The oldest parts indicate a pre-Seljuk building, and it is possible the mosque was built on the site of a chahar taq. The structure was incorporated in a Seljuk kiosk mosque in the 12th century, and further expanded to the classical four-iwan plan. The stucco decoration of the mihrab was altered during the Il-Khanid period.
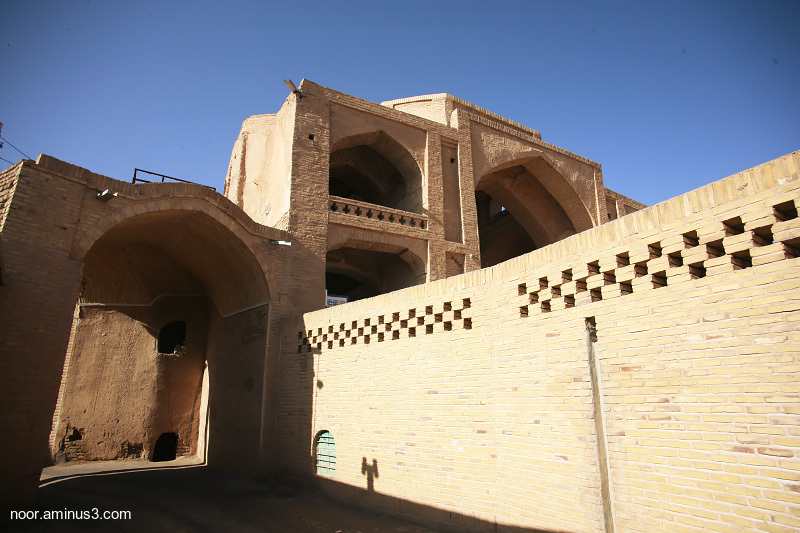

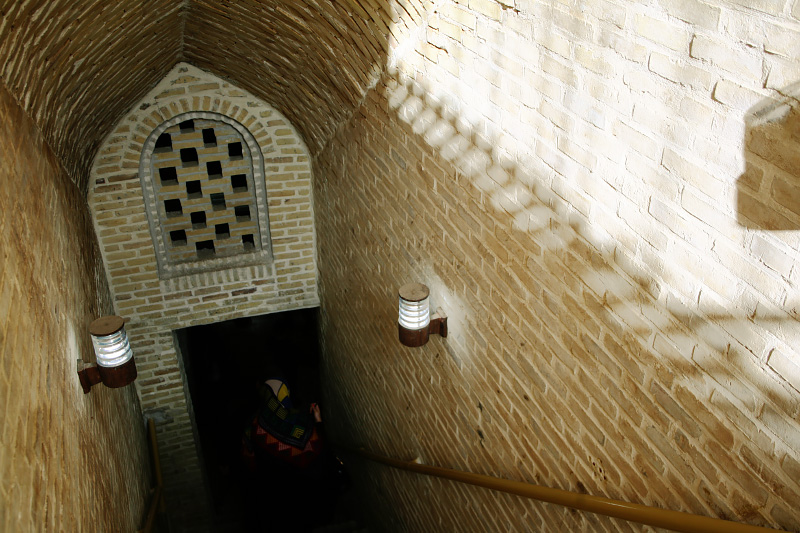

== Notable people ==
- Mustafa Tabataba’inejhad, Shia Cleric
- Yousef Tabatabai Nejad, Shia Cleric

== See also ==
Media related to Ardestan at Wikimedia Commons
