= Pamenar Mosque =

Shah Mosque (Persian: مسجد پامنار) may refer to:

- Pamenar Mosque, Sabzevar
- Pamenar Mosque, Mehdishahr
- Pamenar Mosque, Kerman
