= Pamenar Mosque, Sabzevar =

Mosque in Sabzevar, Razavi Khorasan, Iran

Pamenar Mosque
- مسجد پامنار
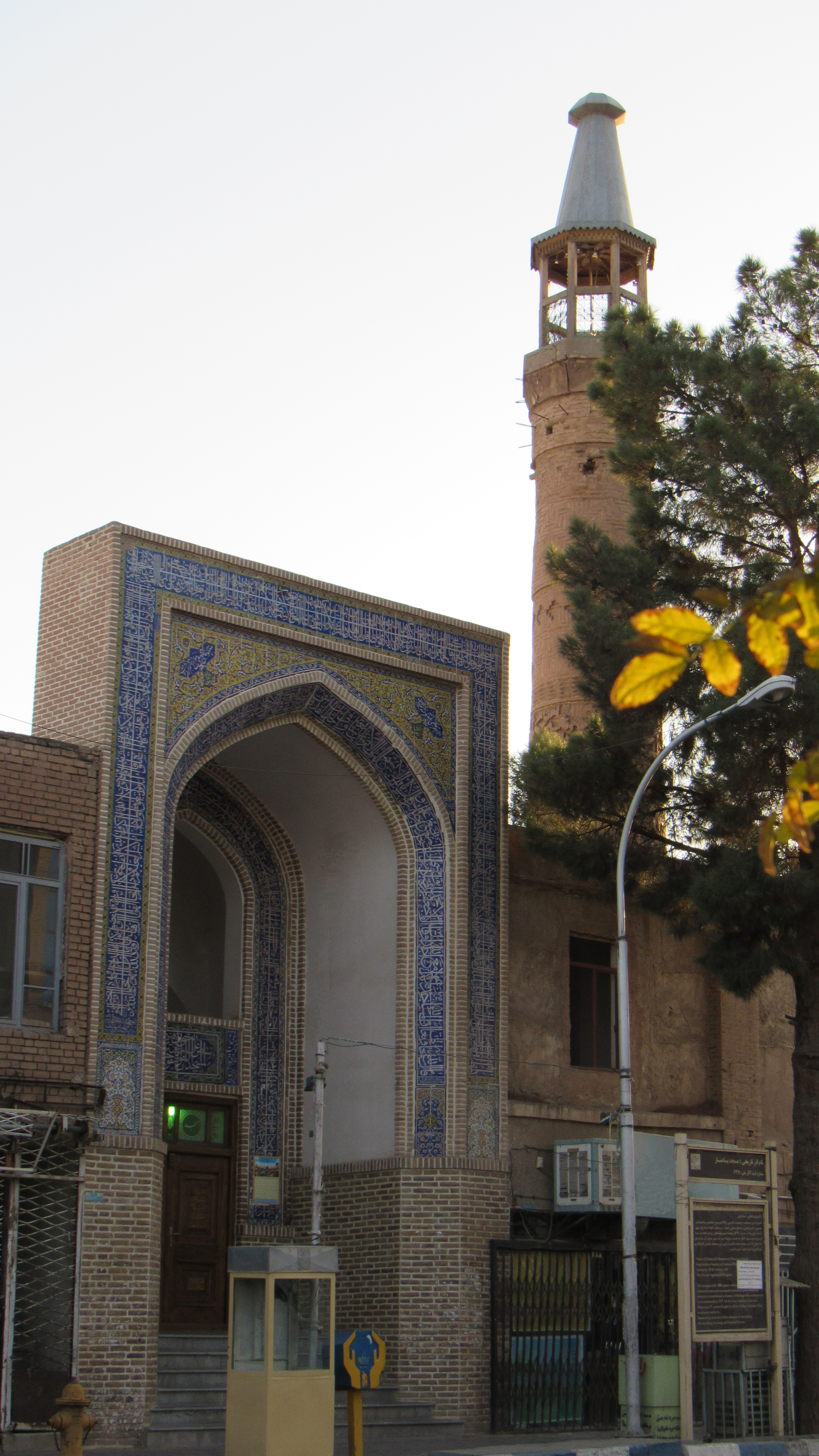
- The mosque entrance iwan and minaret, in 2016

- Location of the mosque in Iran

Religion
- Affiliation: Shia Islam
- Ecclesiastical or organisational status: Mosque
- Status: Active

Location
- Location: Sabzevar, Razavi Khorasan Province
- Country: Iran
- Coordinates: 36°12′26″N 57°40′45″E

Architecture
- Type: Mosque architecture
- Style: Tahirid; Samanid (renovation); Ghaznavid (minaret); Safavid (renovation); Qajar (hall)
- Founder: Muhammad of Khorasan
- Completed: 880 CE (original structure); 929 CE (renovation); 1029 CE (minaret)

Specifications
- Interior area: 934 m^{2} (10,050 sq ft)
- Dome: One (maybe more)
- Minaret: One
- Minaret height: 15 m (49 ft)
- Materials: Bricks; mortar; tiles

Iran National Heritage List
- Official name: Pamenar Mosque
- Type: Mosque
- Designated: 1967
- Reference no.: 647
- Conservation organization: Cultural Heritage, Handicrafts and Tourism Organization of Iran

The Pamenar Mosque (Persian: مسجد پامنار, romanized: Masjed-e Pa-Menar), sometimes known as the Pa Minar Mosque — referring to its minar — is a mosque located in Sabzevar, in the province of Razavi Khorasan, Iran.

== Overview ==
The mosque dates from 880 CE, during the Tahirid era, and is one of the oldest monuments in central Sabzevar. Adjacent to the mosque is a 15-metre-tall (49 ft) swinging minaret, erected in 1029 CE, during the Samanid era. The stunning brick minaret is adorned with Kufic inscriptions and is attached to an iwan. Azure tiles bearing white Qur'anic verses adorn the mosque that was extensively renovated and expanded during the Safavid era to include a nine-arched sanctuary with three semi-arches. The mosque was added to the Iran National Heritage List on 12 April 1967, administered by the Cultural Heritage, Handicrafts and Tourism Organization of Iran.

== Gallery ==
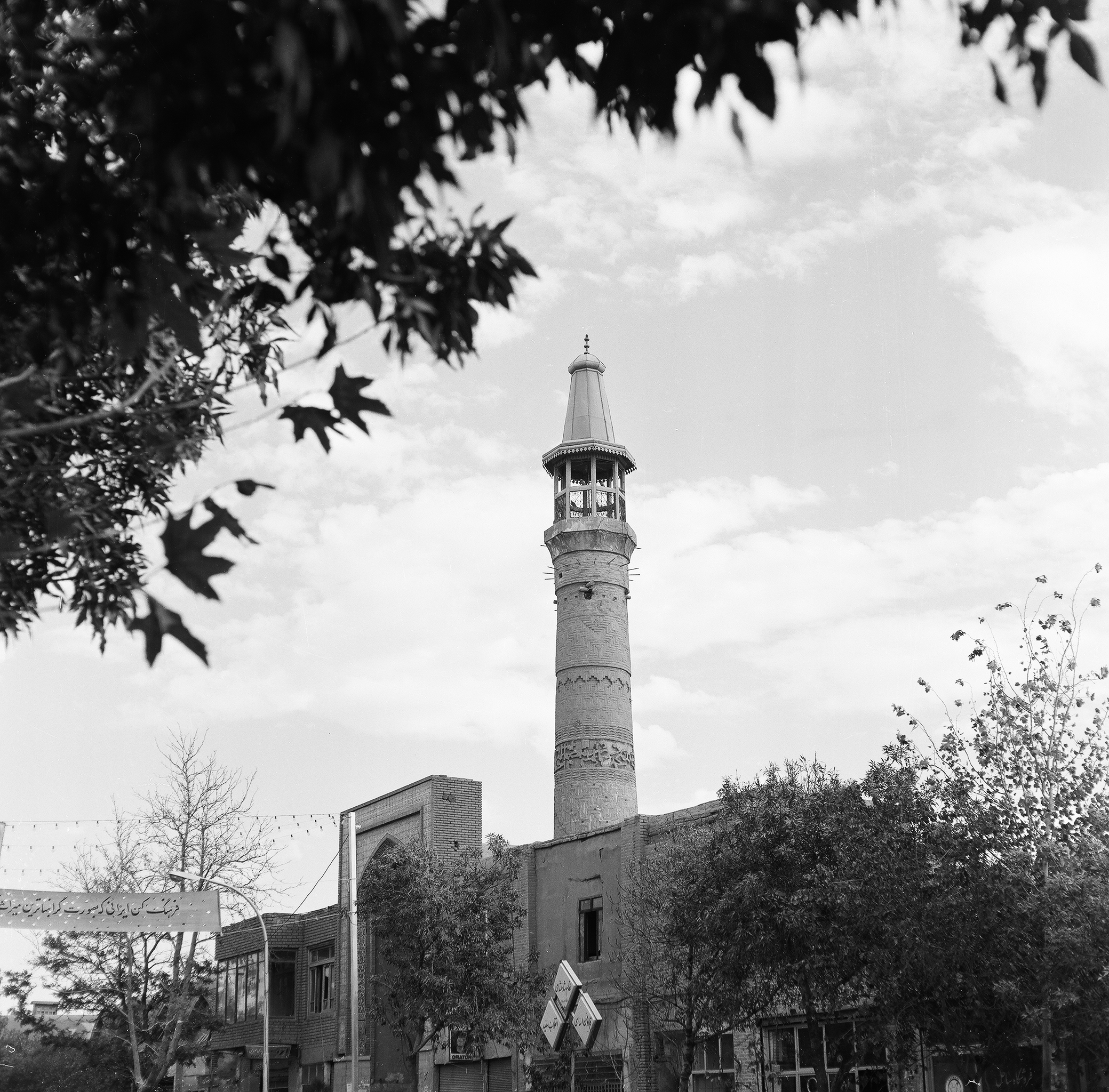
Minaret of the mosque

== See also ==
- Shia Islam in Iran
- List of mosques in Iran
