= Pamenar Mosque, Kerman =

Mosque in Kerman, Iran

Pamenar Mosque
- مسجد پامنار (کرمان)
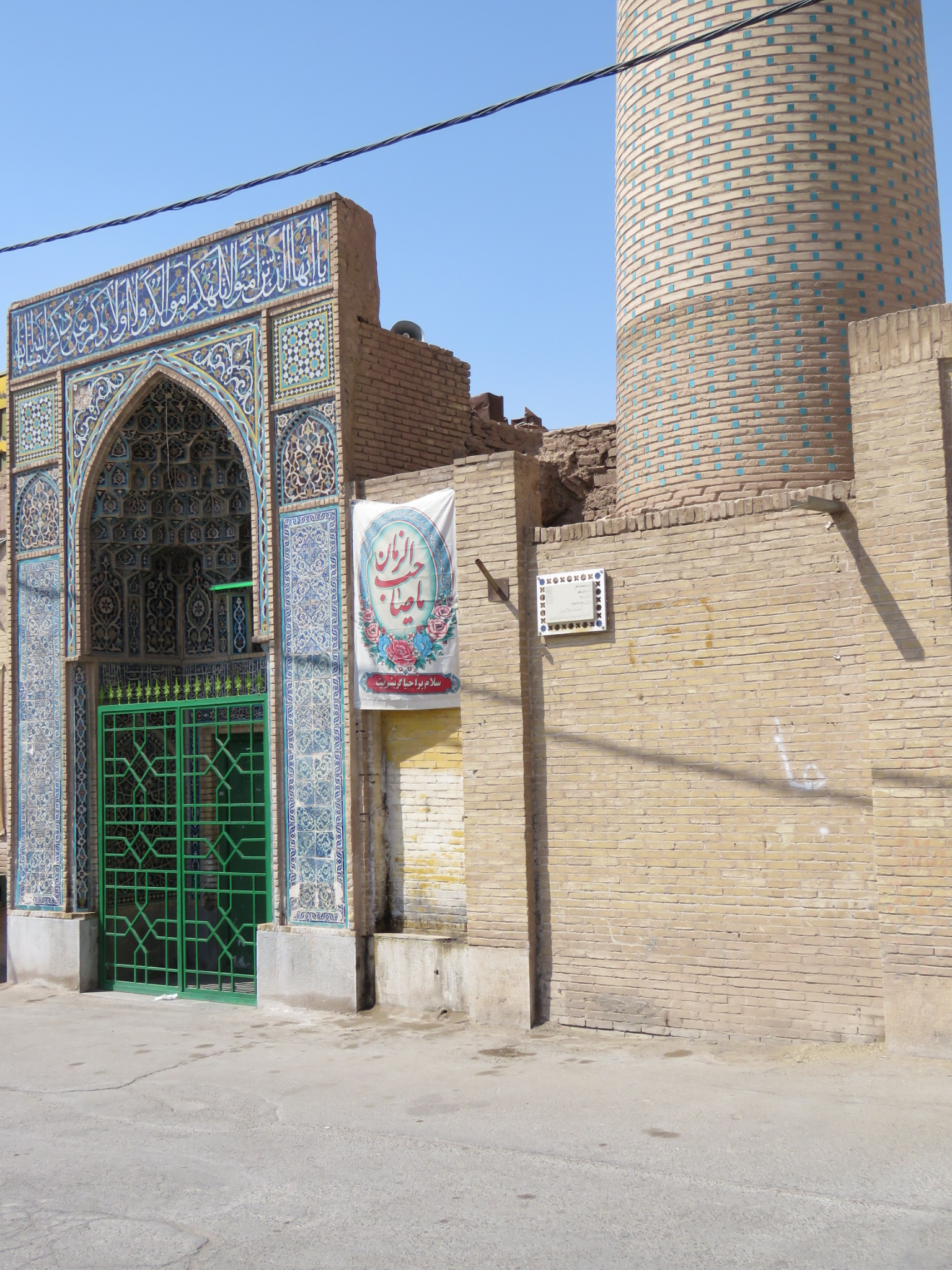
- An iwan of the mosque, in 2018

- Location of the mosque in Iran

Religion
- Affiliation: Shia Islam
- Ecclesiastical or organisational status: Mosque
- Status: Active

Location
- Location: Kerman, Kerman Province
- Country: Iran
- Coordinates: 30°17′49″N 57°4′50″E

Architecture
- Type: Mosque architecture
- Completed: 14th century CE; Muzaffarid era

Specifications
- Minaret: One
- Materials: Bricks; mortar

Iran National Heritage List
- Official name: Pamenar Mosque
- Type: Mosque
- Designated: 1934
- Reference no.: 210
- Conservation organization: Cultural Heritage, Handicrafts and Tourism Organization of Iran

The Pamenar Mosque (Persian: مسجد پامنار (کرمان); Arabic: مسجد بامنار (كرمان)), also known as the Al-Zahra Mosque, is a mosque, located in the city of Kerman, the capital of the province of Kerman, Iran. The mosque was completed in the Muzaffarid era, during the 14th century CE.

The mosque was added to the Iran National Heritage List in 1934, administered by the Cultural Heritage, Handicrafts and Tourism Organization of Iran.

== Gallery ==
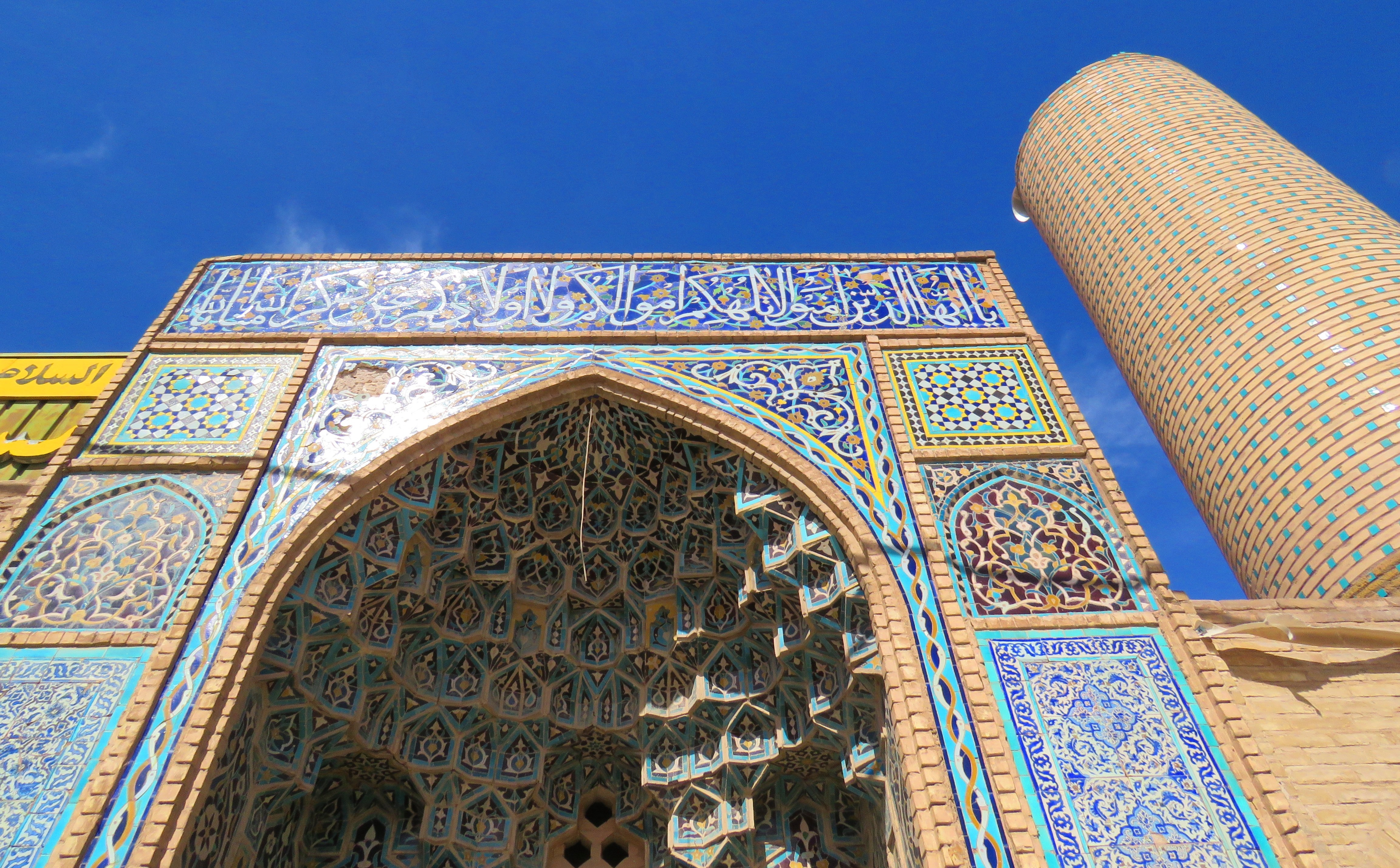
The iwan and minaret, in 2020

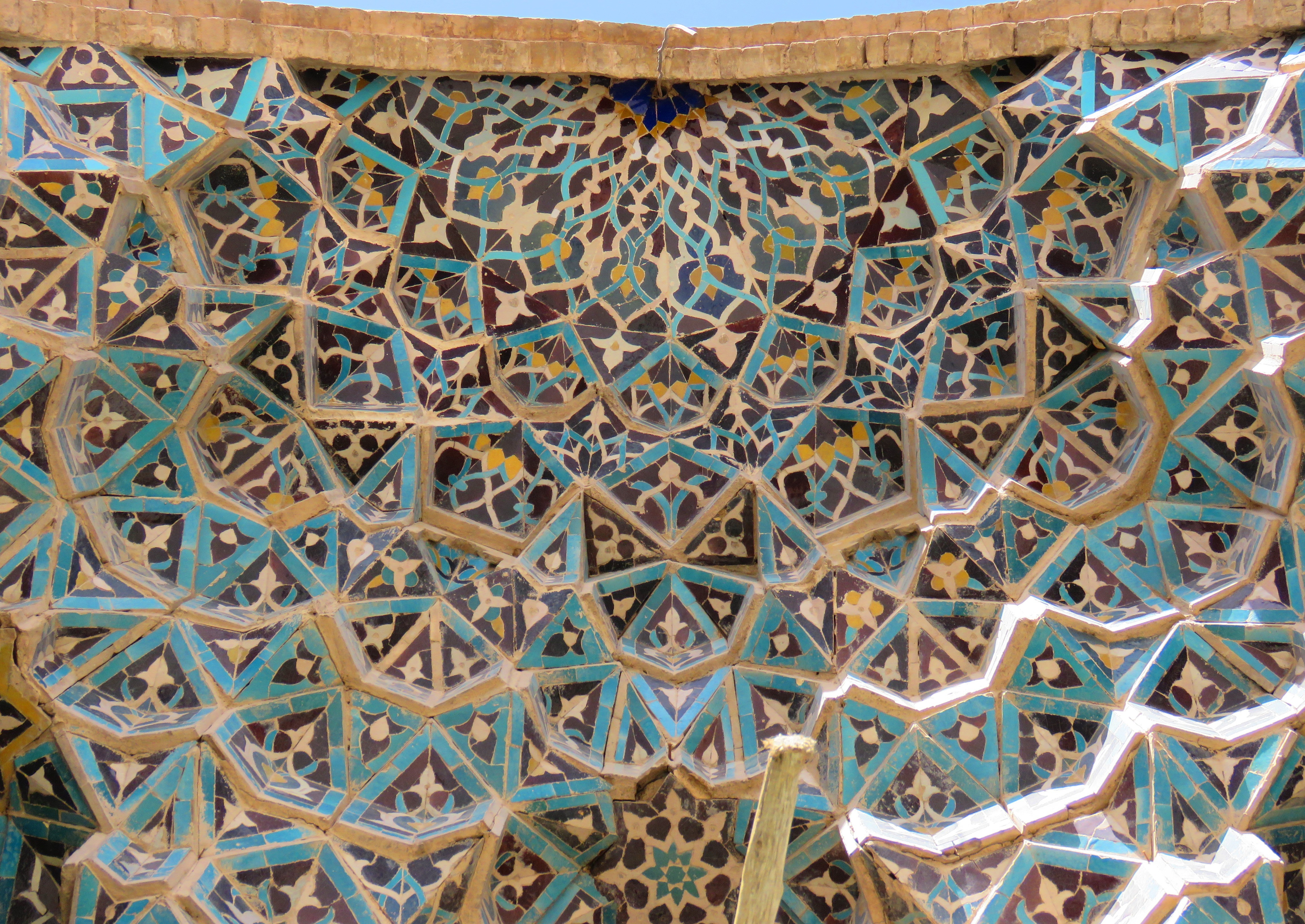
Detail of the iwan ceiling

== See also ==
- Shia Islam in Iran
- List of mosques in Iran
