= Al-Nuqtah Mosque =

Shi'ite mosque in Aleppo, Syria

al-Nuqtah Mosque
- مَسْجِد النُّقْطَة
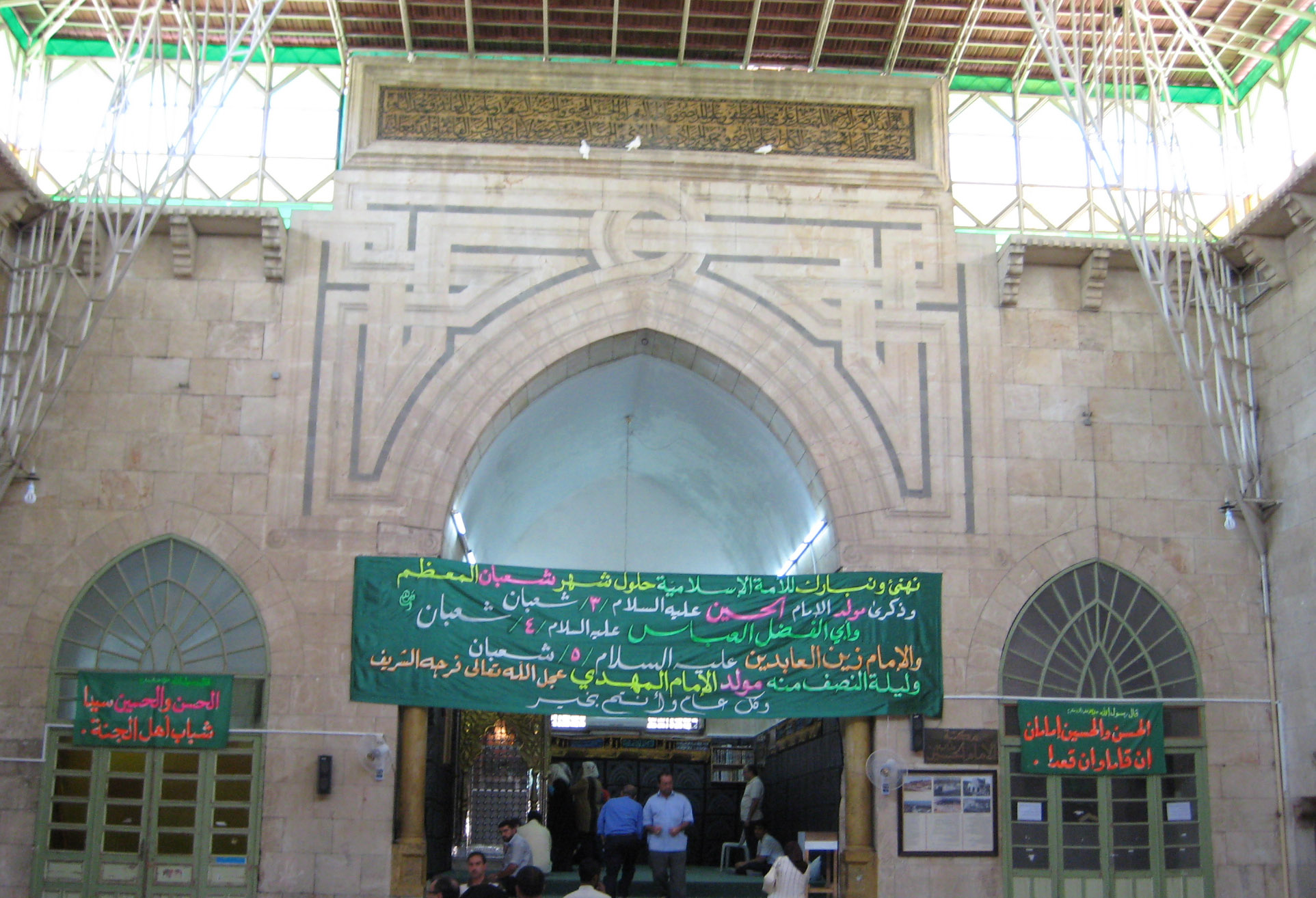
- The mosque prayer hall in 2006

- Location of the mosque in Aleppo

Religion
- Affiliation: Shia Islam
- Ecclesiastical or organisational status: Mosque; Mausoleum
- Status: Active

Location
- Location: Aleppo
- Country: Syria
- Interactive map of al-Nuqtah Mosque
- Coordinates: 36°11′43″N 37°07′58″E

Architecture
- Type: Islamic architecture
- Completed: 944 CE (as a mosque)
- Shrines: 1: (Muhsin, a child of Husayn)

The Al-Nuqtah Mosque (Arabic: مَسْجِد النُّقْطَة, romanized: Masjid an-Nuqṭah, lit. 'Mosque of the Drop [of the Blood of Husayn]') is a Shi'ite mosque located on Mount Jawshan in Aleppo, Syria. The main feature of the mosque is a stone believed by Muslims to be stained with the blood of Husayn ibn ‘Alī.

Also located near this mosque on Mount Jawshan, is a mashad (shrine) known as the Mashad al-Siqt (Arabic: مشهد السقط, lit. 'Place of the Miscarriage'). As the prisoners of Karbalā were passing through Aleppo, one of wives of Husayn had a miscarriage. The still-born child was named Muhsin, and buried at this place.

== History ==
According to Shi'ite sources, the prisoners of Karbalā were taken through many cities on their way to Damascus on orders from Yazīd. As they were nearing Aleppo, a Christian monk who lived there could see light emanating from the head of Husayn, upwards to the sky. When the caravan stopped for rest, the monk approached them and asked if he could take the head for the night in exchange for 10,000 dirhams that he had with him. When they agreed, the monk took the head and placed it on a stone, whereon blood from the head fell onto it. In the morning he returned the head and professed Islam. This version of events is written on a plaque within the mosque, dated 944 CE.

=== Other versions of the story ===
- Other Shia narrations relate that when the prisoners of Karbalā were passing through Aleppo, the head of Husayn was placed upon a rock. When blood from the head fell onto the rock, more blood began gushing forth from the rock.
- Sunni sources narrate that a shepherd had a dream wherein he was instructed to build a mosque in honour of Husayn, at the place where one of his goats had its foot sunken into rock. When the shepherd awoke and pulled the goat free from the rock, a river of water began to gush forth.

=== Developments since the 20th century ===
The mosque suffered an explosion in 1920 when King Faisal ordered his men to store gunpowder in the mosque. Restorations to the mosque began forty years later, and were completed by the 1970s. The current roof of the mosque was built in 1991.

In 2017 it was reported that the mosque reopened after closure during the Battle of Aleppo, since 2012.

Hajar-ul-Nuqteh was believed to be at Karachi, Pakistan between 2016 and 2017. It is with a local scholar, Dr Amber Tajwer's residence at Karachi during that time with the written permission from one of Administrative of Al-Nuqtah Mosque. It was placed for security reasons and was on display for limited gathering.

== Gallery ==
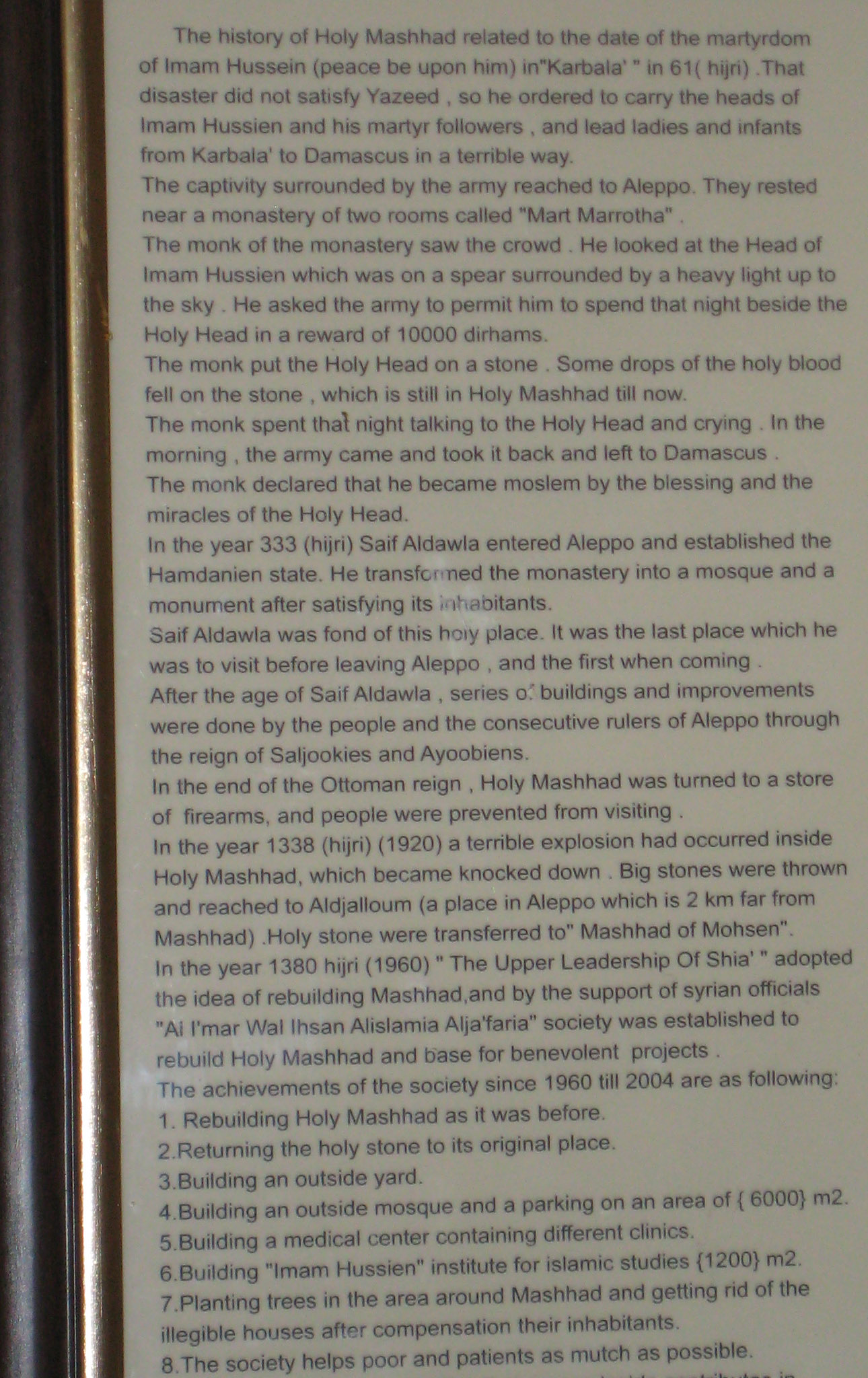
A plaque within the mosque suggests that the site was converted from a monastery in 944 CE

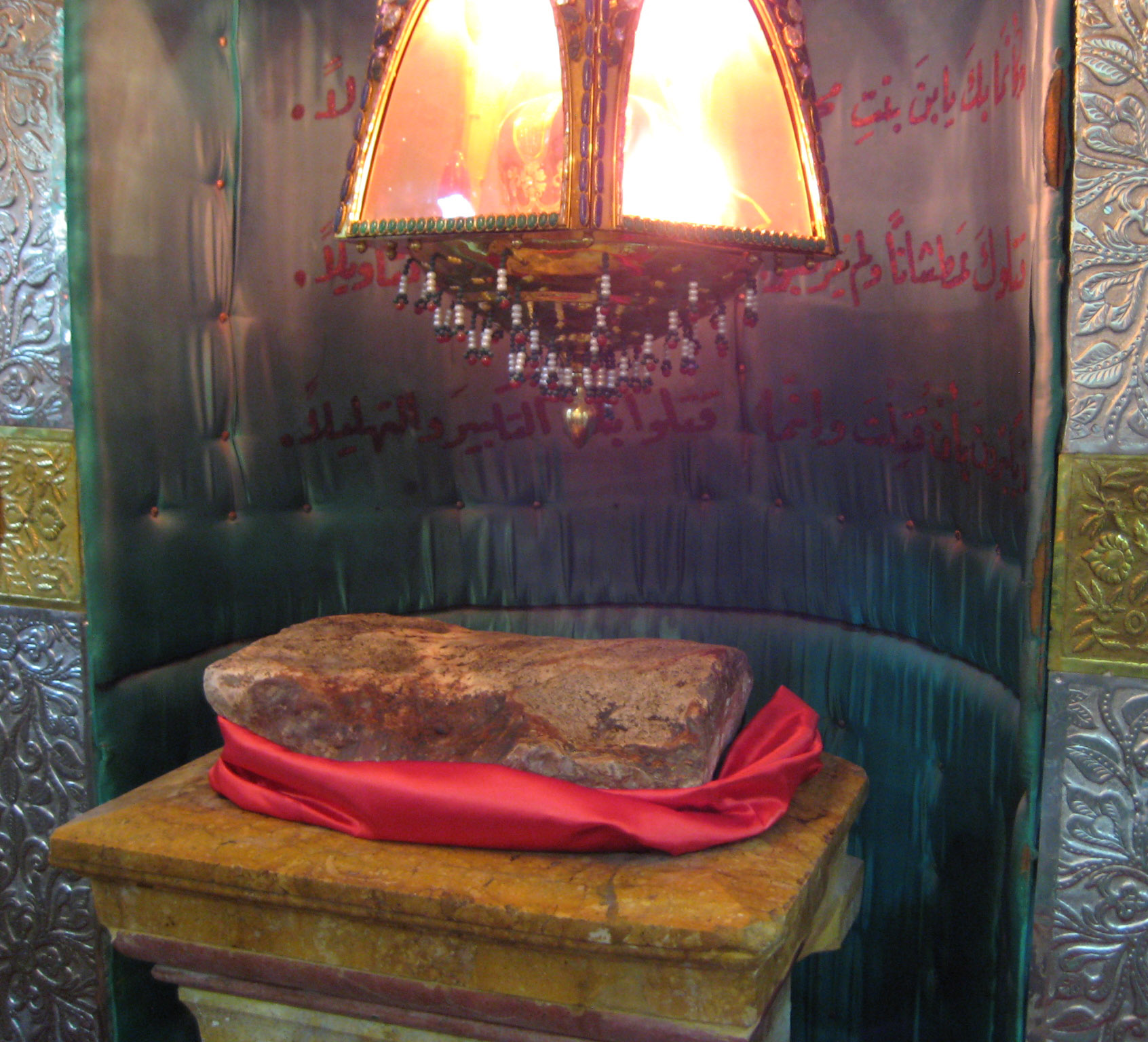
The blood-stained stone within the mosque

== See also ==
- Shia Islam in Syria
- List of mosques in Aleppo
- List of mosques in Syria
- Holiest sites in Islam (Shia)
