= Imamzadeh Hamzeh, Kashmar =

Oldest mosque in Kashmar

Imamzadeh Hamzah, Kashmar
- امامزاده سید حمزه (کاشمر)
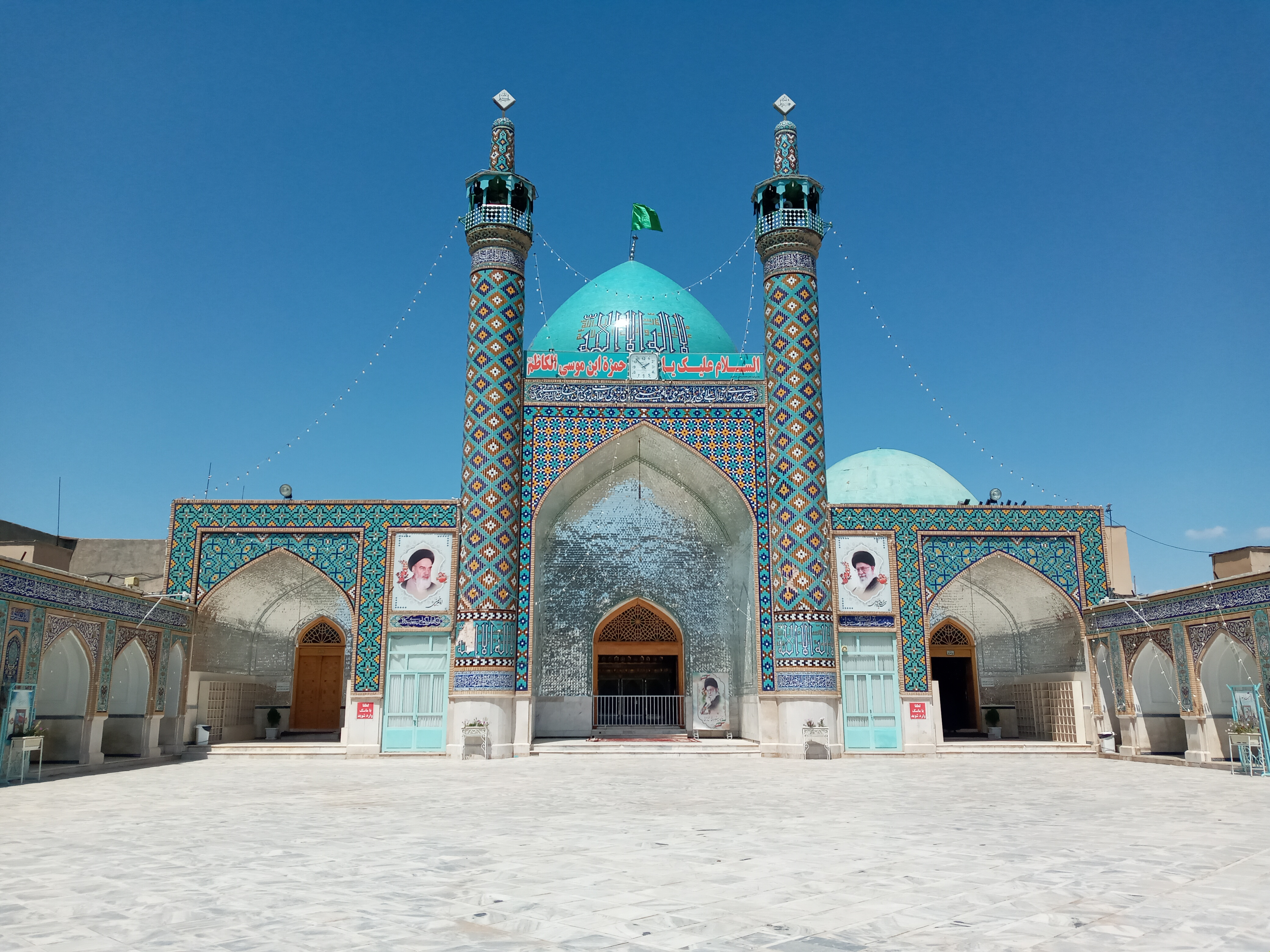
- The shrine in 2021

- Location of the complex in Iran

Religion
- Affiliation: Shia (Twelver)
- Ecclesiastical or organisational status: Imamzadeh and mosque
- Status: Active

Location
- Location: Kashmar, Razavi Khorasan province
- Country: Iran
- Interactive map of Imamzadeh Hamzah, Kashmar
- Coordinates: 35°14′29″N 58°28′20″E

Architecture
- Type: Islamic architecture
- Style: Safavid; Pahlavi

Specifications
- Dome: Two
- Minaret: Two

Iran National Heritage List
- Official name: Imamzadeh Hamzah
- Type: Built
- Designated: 31 May 2003
- Reference no.: 8738
- Conservation organization: Cultural Heritage, Handicrafts and Tourism Organization of Iran

The Imamzadeh Hamzah (Persian: امامزاده سید حمزه (کاشمر); Arabic: مرقد حمزة الكاظم (كاشمر)) is a Twelver Shia imamzadeh and mosque complex, located in Kashmar, in the province of Razavi Khorasan, Iran. The funerary complex includes the tomb of Sayyid Ḥamzah ibn Mūsā, a son of the seventh Shia Imam Musa al-Kazim. The complex was added to the Iran National Heritage List on 31 May 2003, administered by the Cultural Heritage, Handicrafts and Tourism Organization of Iran, and is a holy site in Shia Islam.

== Gallery ==
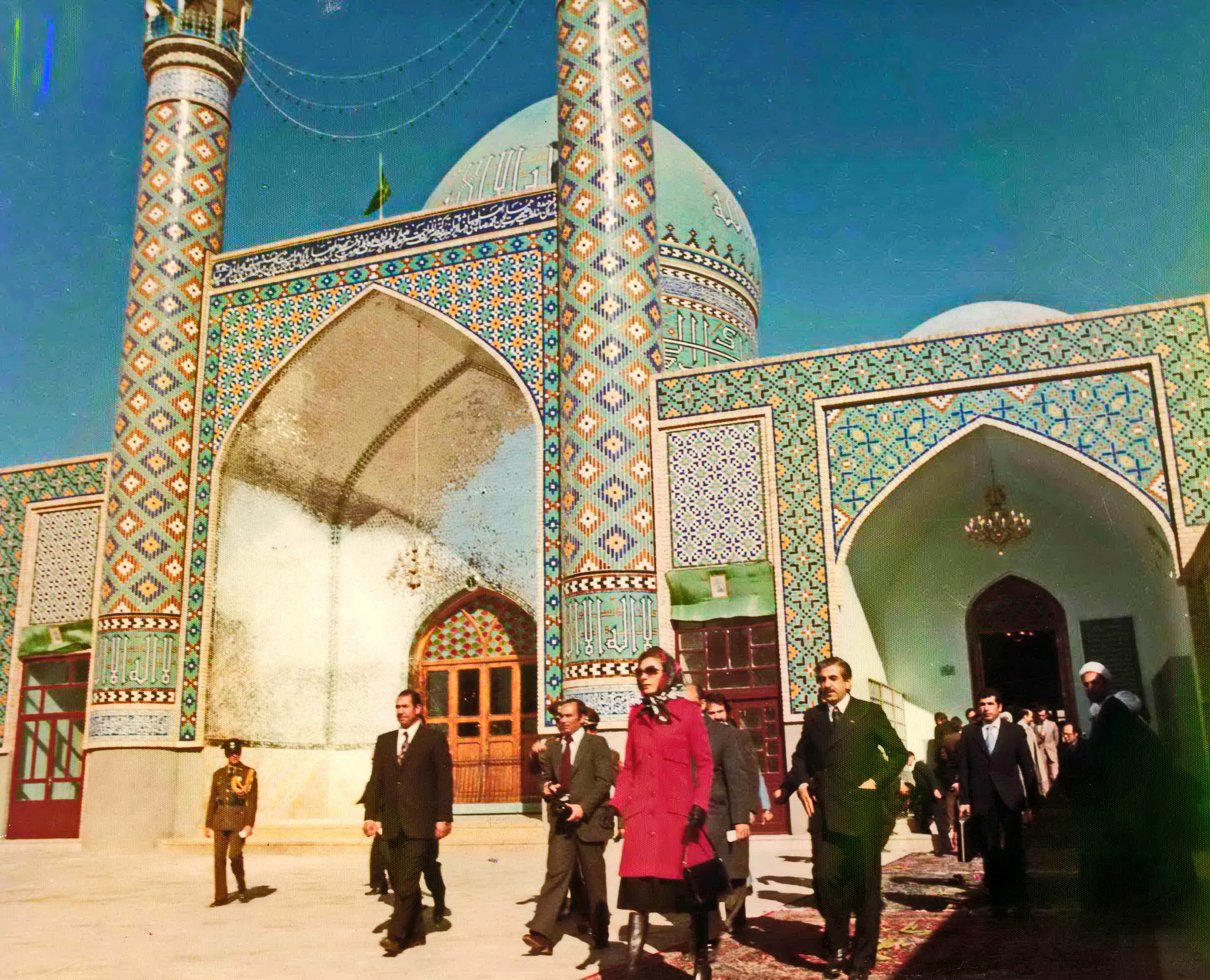
Empress Farah visiting the shrine in December 1974

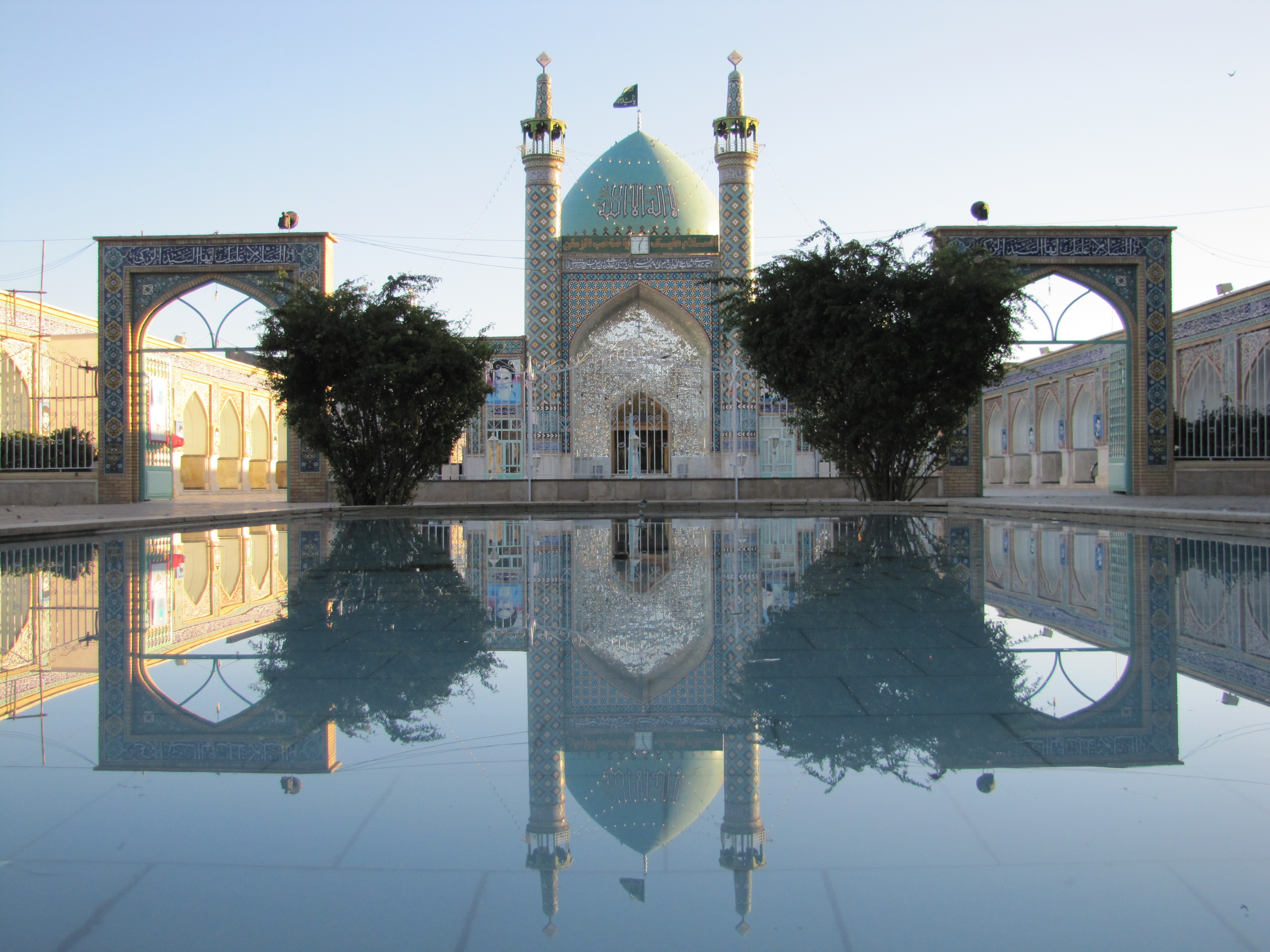
Exterior

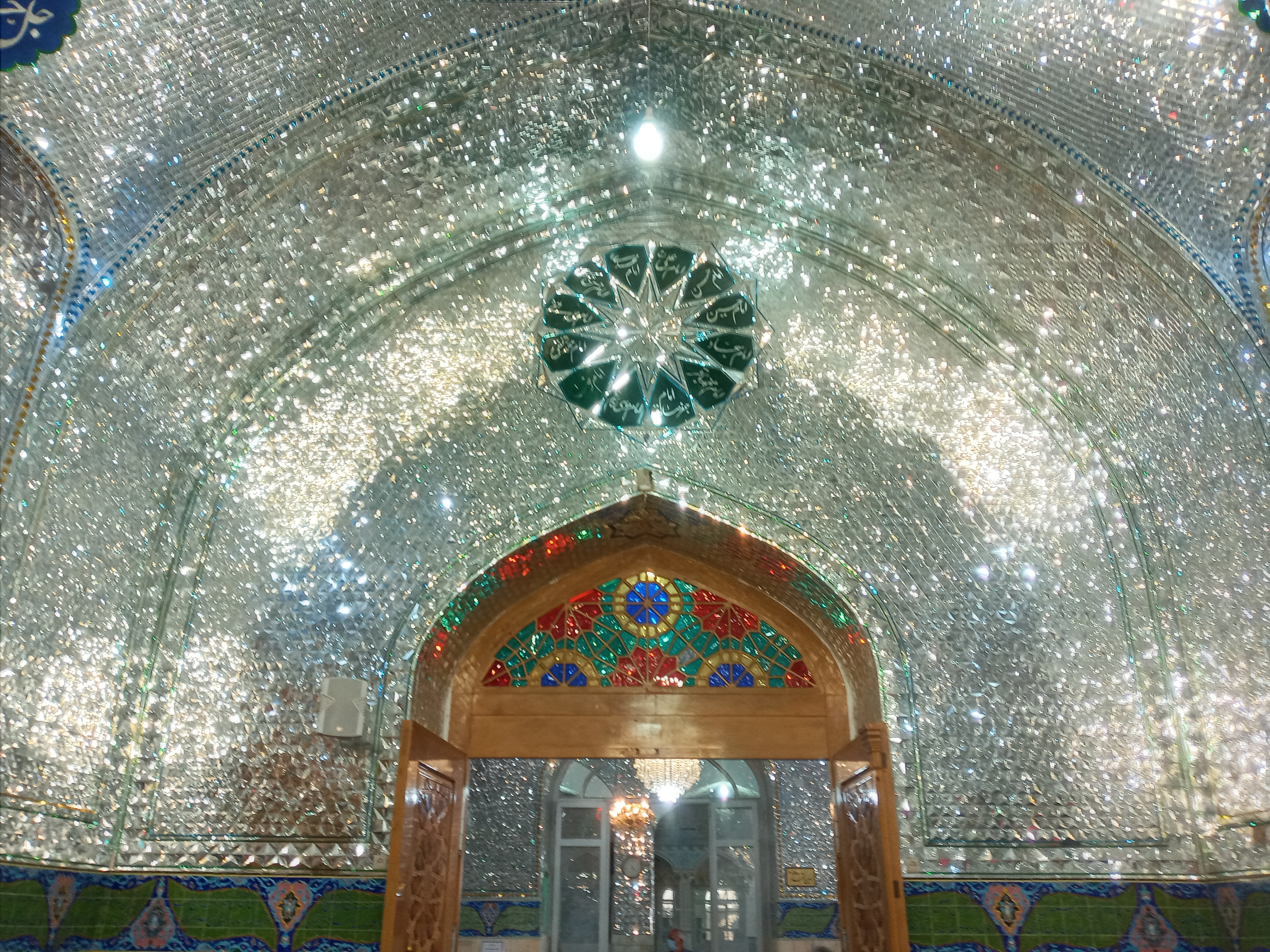
Interior featuring ayeneh-kari

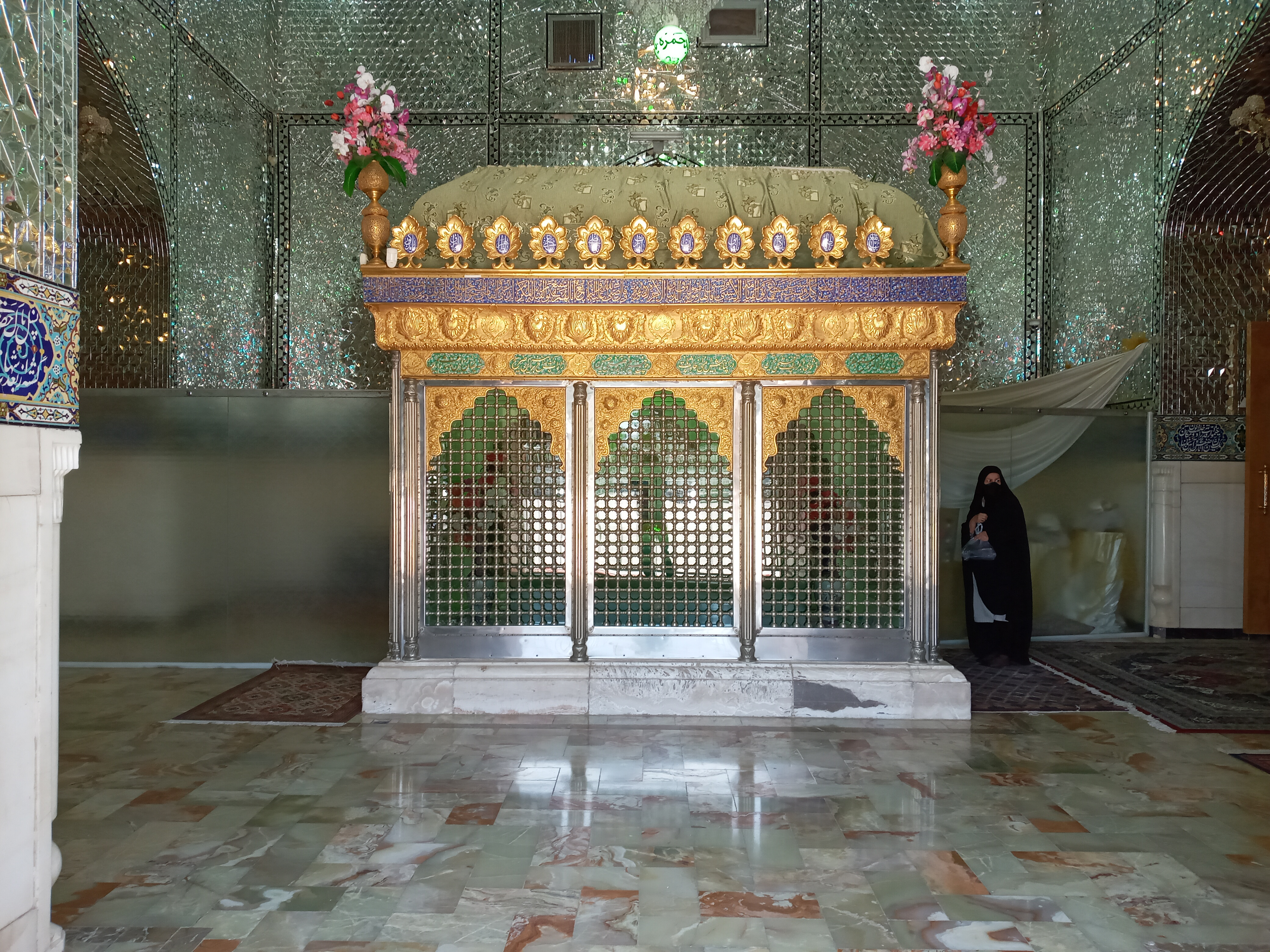
Zarih

== See also ==
- Holiest sites in Shia Islam
- Shia Islam in Iran
- List of imamzadehs in Iran
- List of mausoleums in Iran
- List of mosques in Iran
- Persian domes
