= Al-Sahlah Mosque =

Twelver Shi'ite mosque in Kufa, Iraq

- مَسْجِد ٱلسَّهْلَة
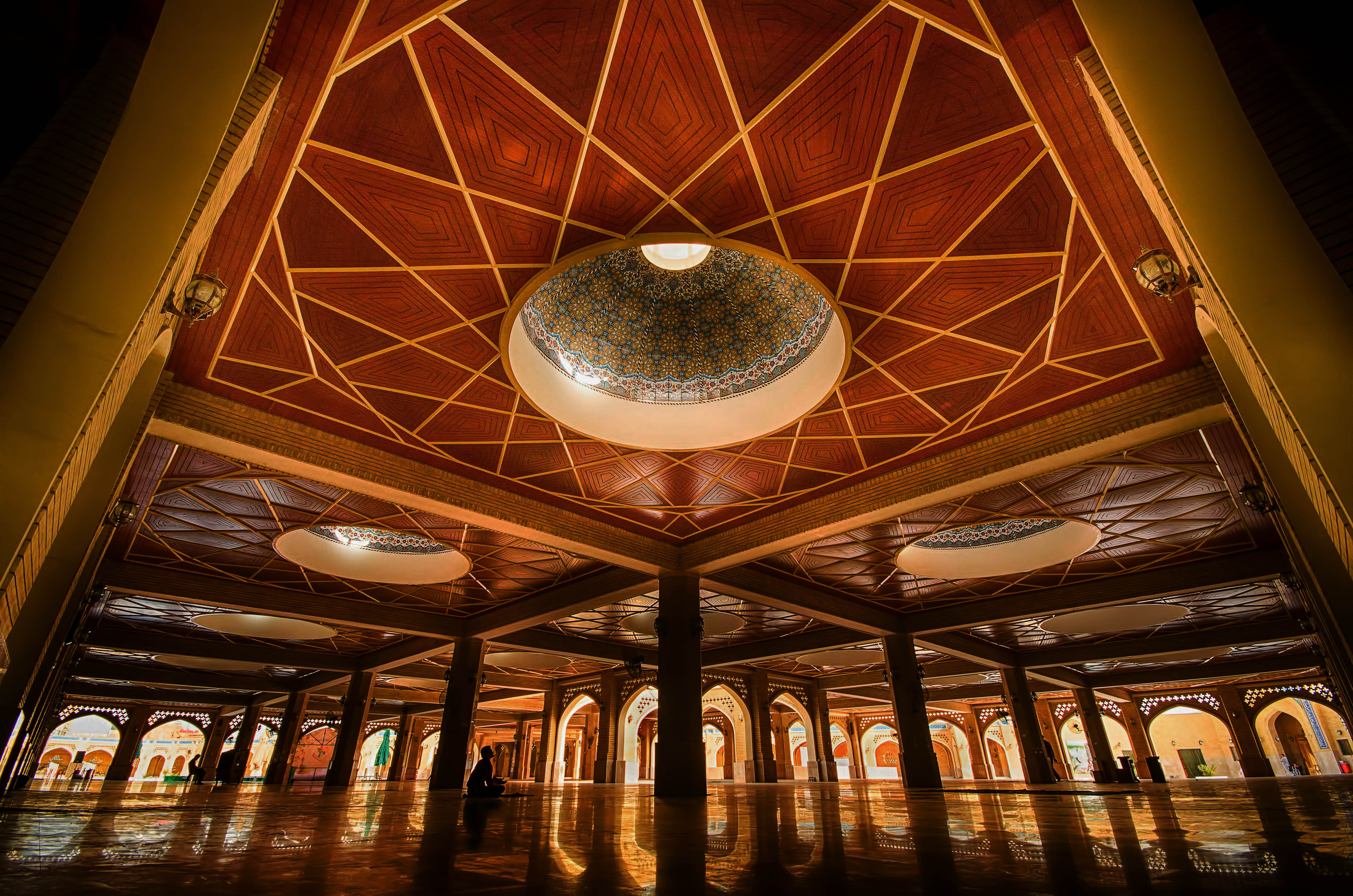
- The mosque prayer hall in 2015

- Location of the mosque in Iraq

Religion
- Affiliation: Shia (Twelver)
- Ecclesiastical or organisational status: Shrine
- Status: Active
- Future home: 12th Imam, Hujjat-Allah al-Mahdi

Location
- Location: Kufah, Najaf Governorate
- Country: Iraq
- Interactive map of Al-Sahlah Mosque
- Coordinates: 32°2′20″N 44°22′47″E

Architecture
- Architects: Shubber Falah; Wael Ajam; (2011–2018)
- Type: Shi’i mosque
- Style: Islamic architecture
- Completed: 7th century CE (establishment); 750 AH (1349/1350 CE) (reconstruction); late 20th century (reconstruction); 2018 (reconstruction)
- Construction cost: US$8,224,000 (2018)

Specifications
- Length: 140 m (460 ft)
- Width: 125 m (410 ft)
- Interior area: 17,500 m^{2} (188,000 sq ft)
- Dome: One (maybe more)
- Minaret: Two
- Minaret height: 30 m (98 ft)
- Shrine: Seven

The Al-Sahlah Mosque (Arabic: مَسْجِد ٱلسَّهْلَة, romanized: Masjid as-Sahlah) is a Twelver Shia mosque and shrine, located in the city of Kufa, in the Najaf Governorate of Iraq. The mosque is a holy site in Shia Islam, and it is believed that the mosque was initially established in Kufa as a neighborhood mosque for the followers of Ali, the early members of the Shia. The mosque is said to be the future home of the Twelfth Imam, Muhammad al-Mahdi (The Mahdi).

== History ==
The mosque is believed to have been established during the 7th century CE. It has been reconstructured many times in the intervening years, including in 750 AH (1349/1350 CE), in the later part of the 20th century, and between 2011 and 2018. A new sahn, named "The Sahn of Sayyidah Nargis", was opened to the public in July 2013.

== Significance ==
The mosque is revered from narrations according to Twelver belief. These beliefs include that the mosque is where the twelfth Imam, Hujjat-Allah al-Mahdi, will reside upon his return. It is also believed that the mosque served as a home for the Prophets and figures in Islam: Ibrahim (Abraham), Idris (Enoch), and Khidr. Every Prophet is said to have established prayers within the mosque. The establishment of two Rakats of Islamic Prayer in the mosque is believed to grant a person safety and protection for an entire year. It is believed that the trumpet announcing the Day of Judgement will be blown from the mosque. Seventy thousand people will be resurrected at the mosque, according to narrations and Twelver beliefs, and can enter Heaven without questioning. The first Shia Imam, Ali ibn Abi Talib has also stated that, "No anguished person goes to this mosque, prays in it, and supplicates to God, without God relieving him of his grief and granting him his request."

== Shrines ==
The mosque is believed to contain seven shrines of Twelver prophets and imams, namely:

1. Imam Ja'afar Bin Mohammad As-Sadiq, in the middle of the mosque
2. Prophet Abraham, in the northwest corner of the mosque
3. Prophet Edris, in the southwest corner of the mosque
4. Prophet Al-Kidher, in the corner between the southern and the eastern sides
5. Prophet As-saleheen, or Salih Prophet's shrine, in the corner of the northern and the eastern sides; to the right of the main entrance of the mosque
6. Imam Zain Al-Abedeen and Ali Bin Al-Hussein, in the middle of the mosque
7. Imam Muhammad Al-Mahdi, the 12th Imam, in the middle of the southern side (future home).

== Gallery ==
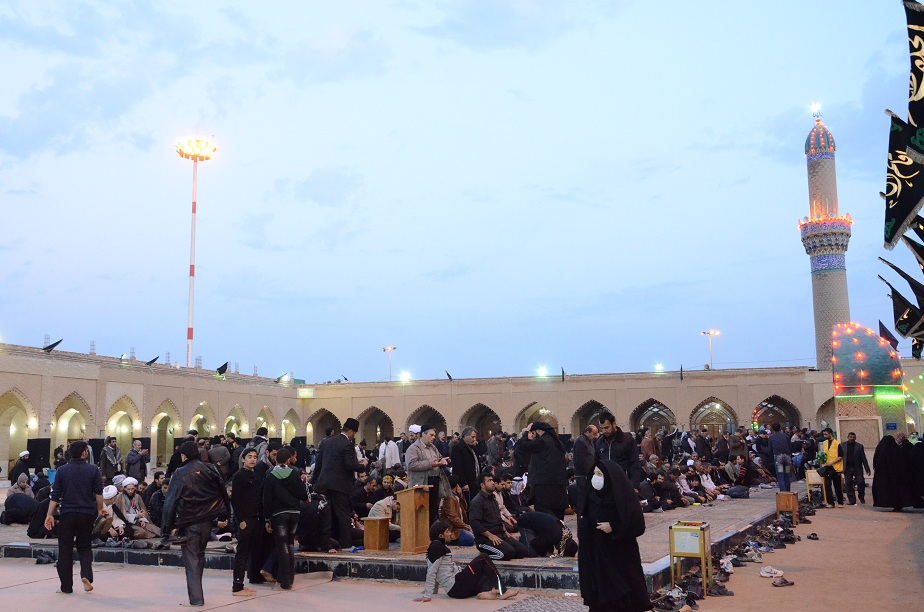
Main courtyard of the mosque

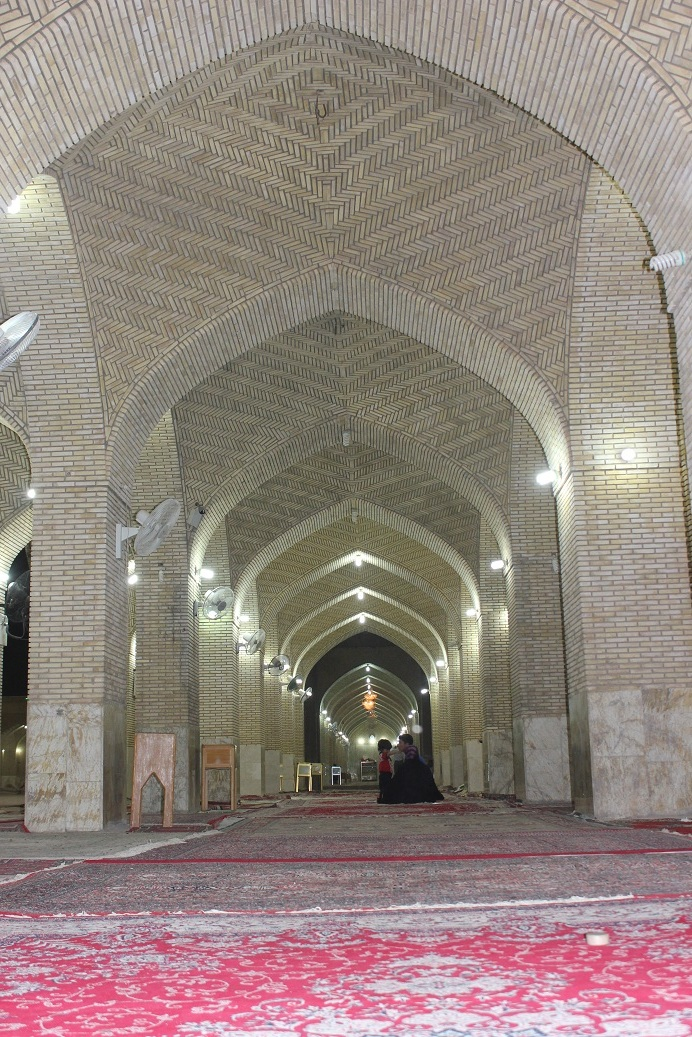
Riwaq of the main courtyard

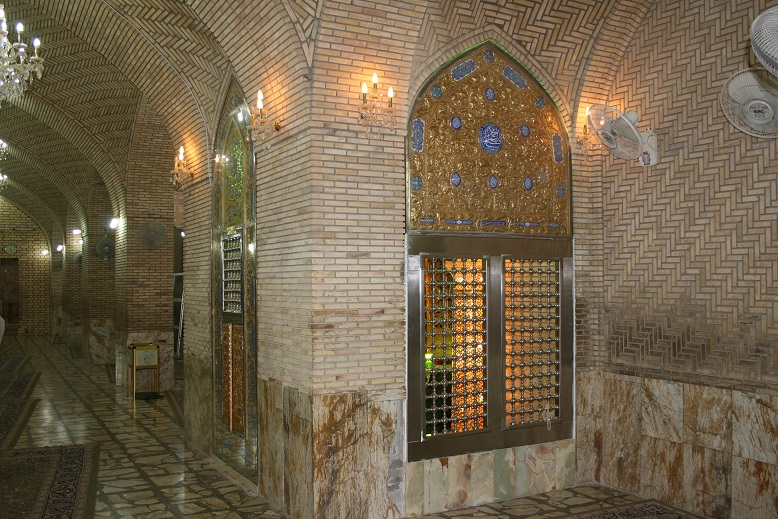
Riwaq of the main courtyard

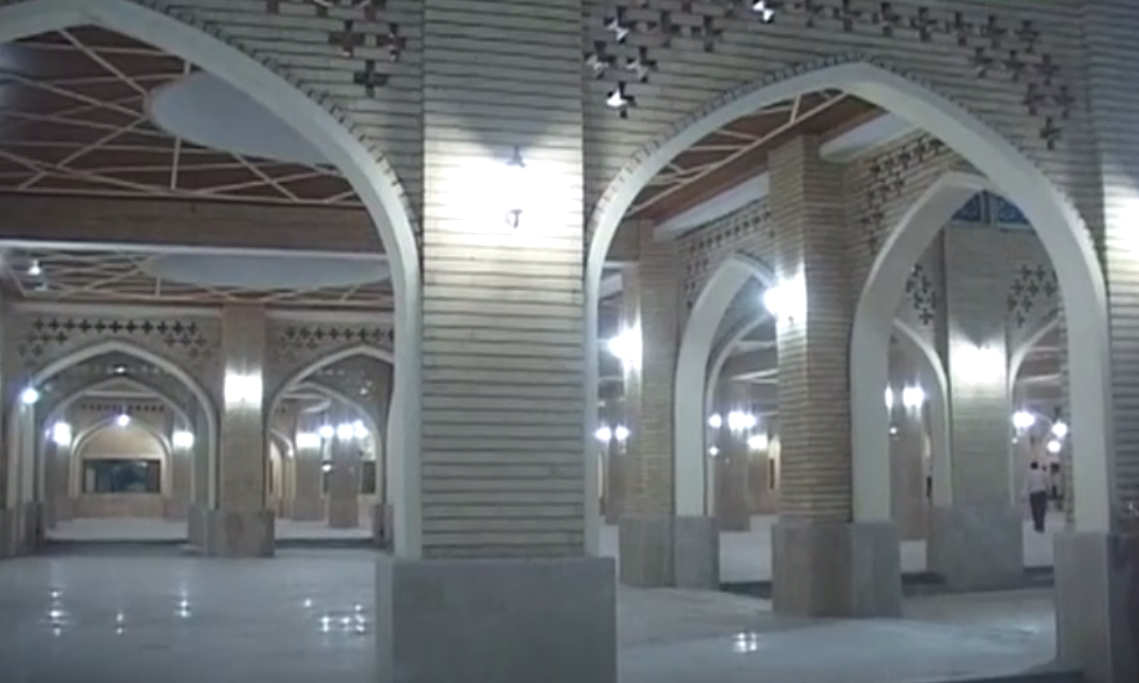
The Sayyidah Nargis sahn

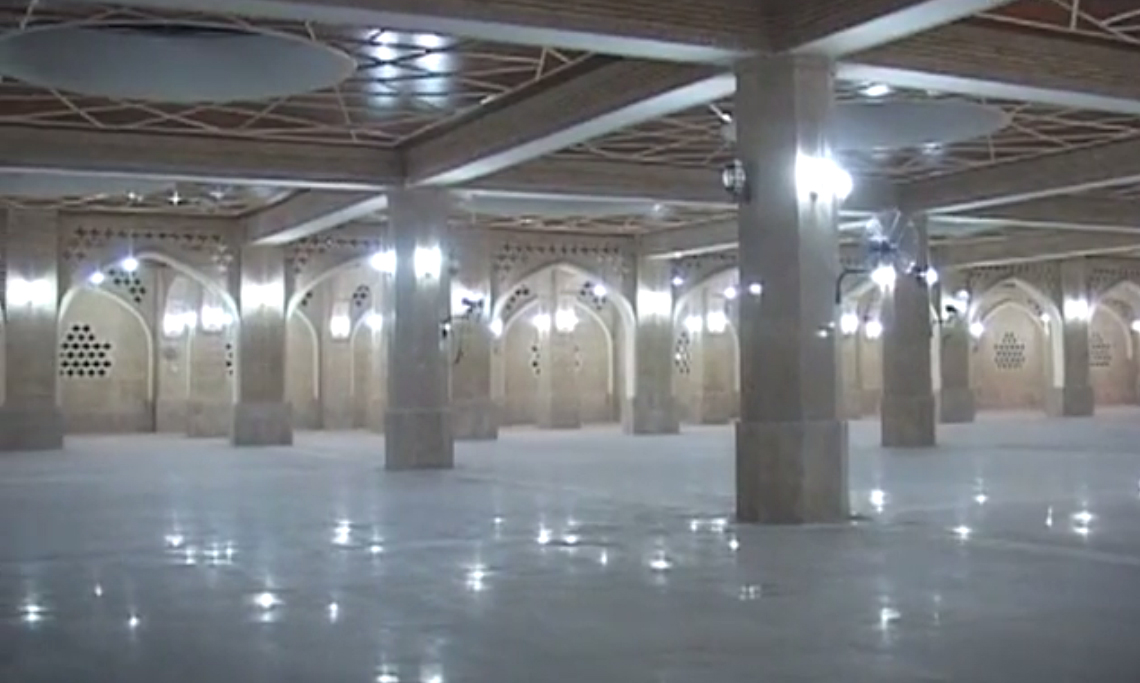
The Sayyidah Nargis sahn

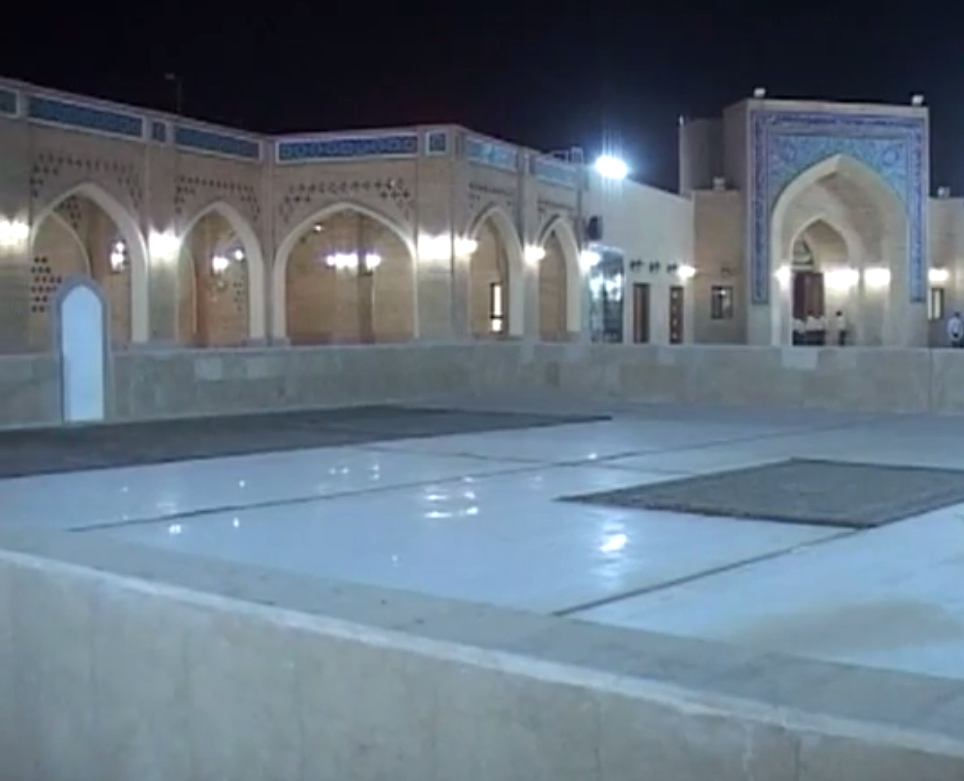
The Sayyidah Nargis sahn

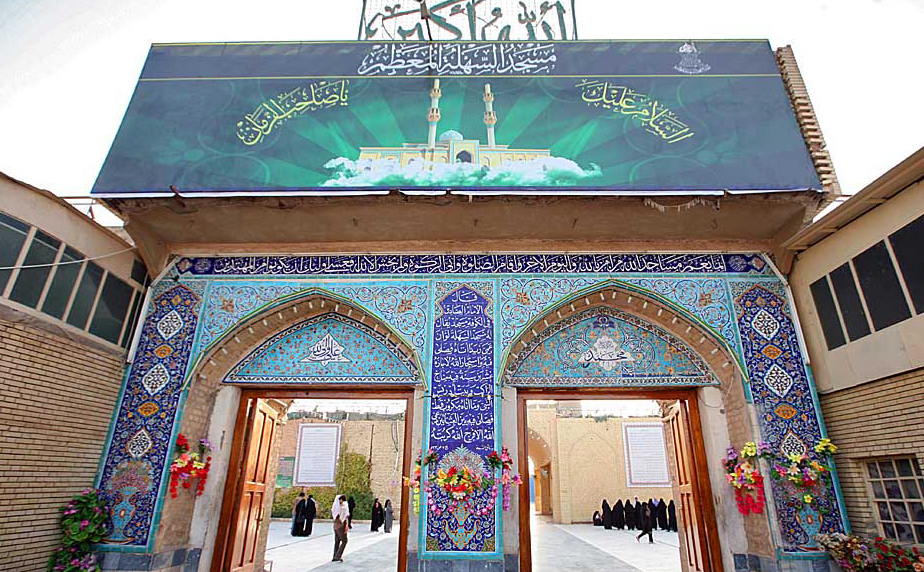
The mosque entrance

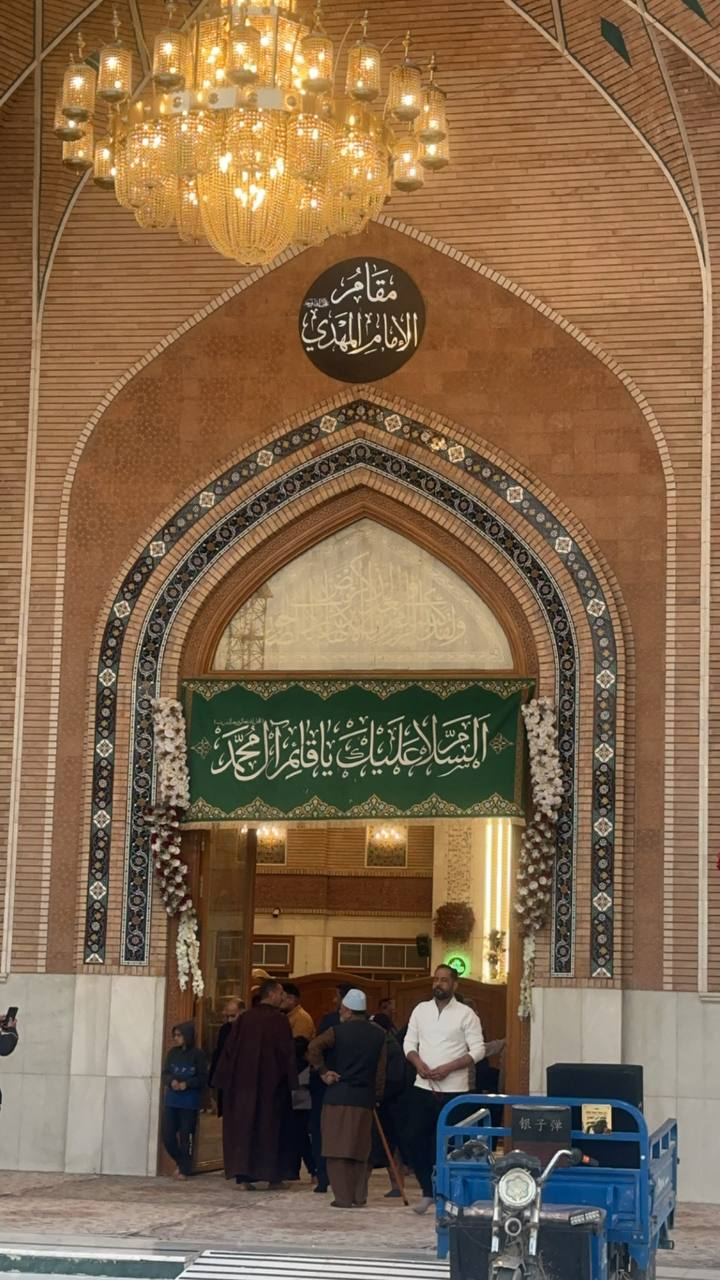
Maqam of Imam al-Mahdi – a historical and religious site in [location]

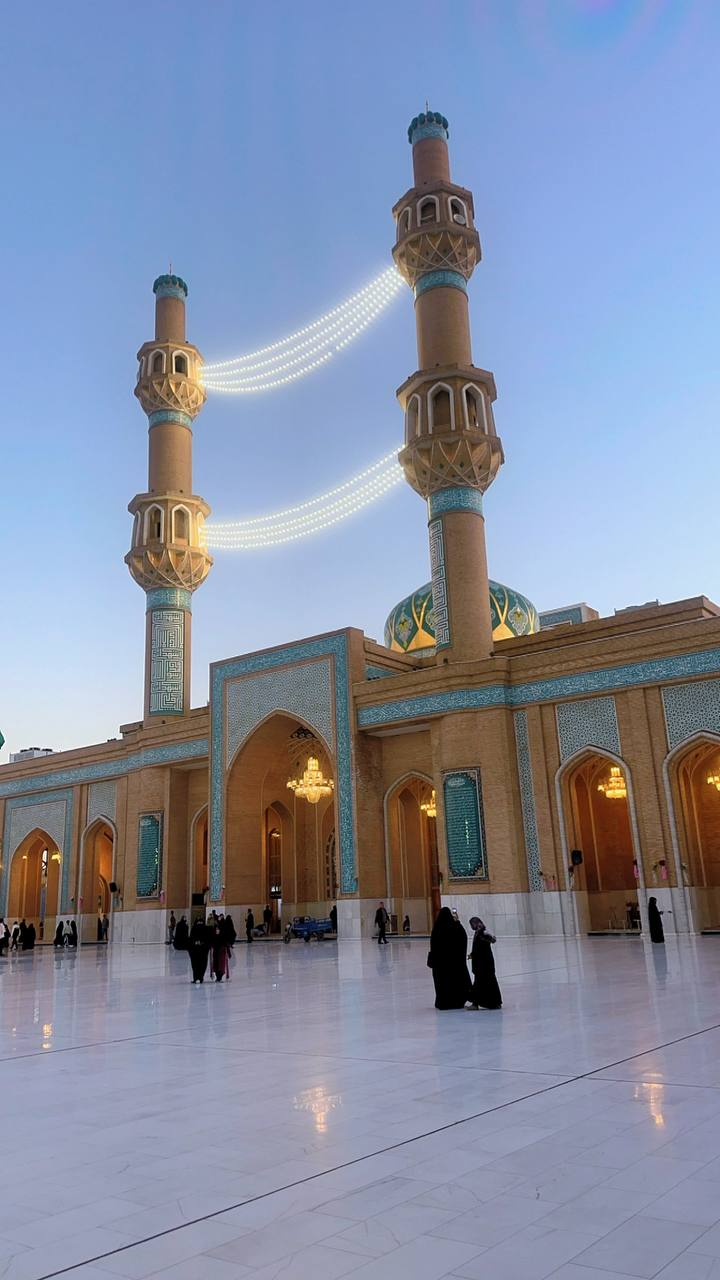
Masjid al-Sahlah Entrance

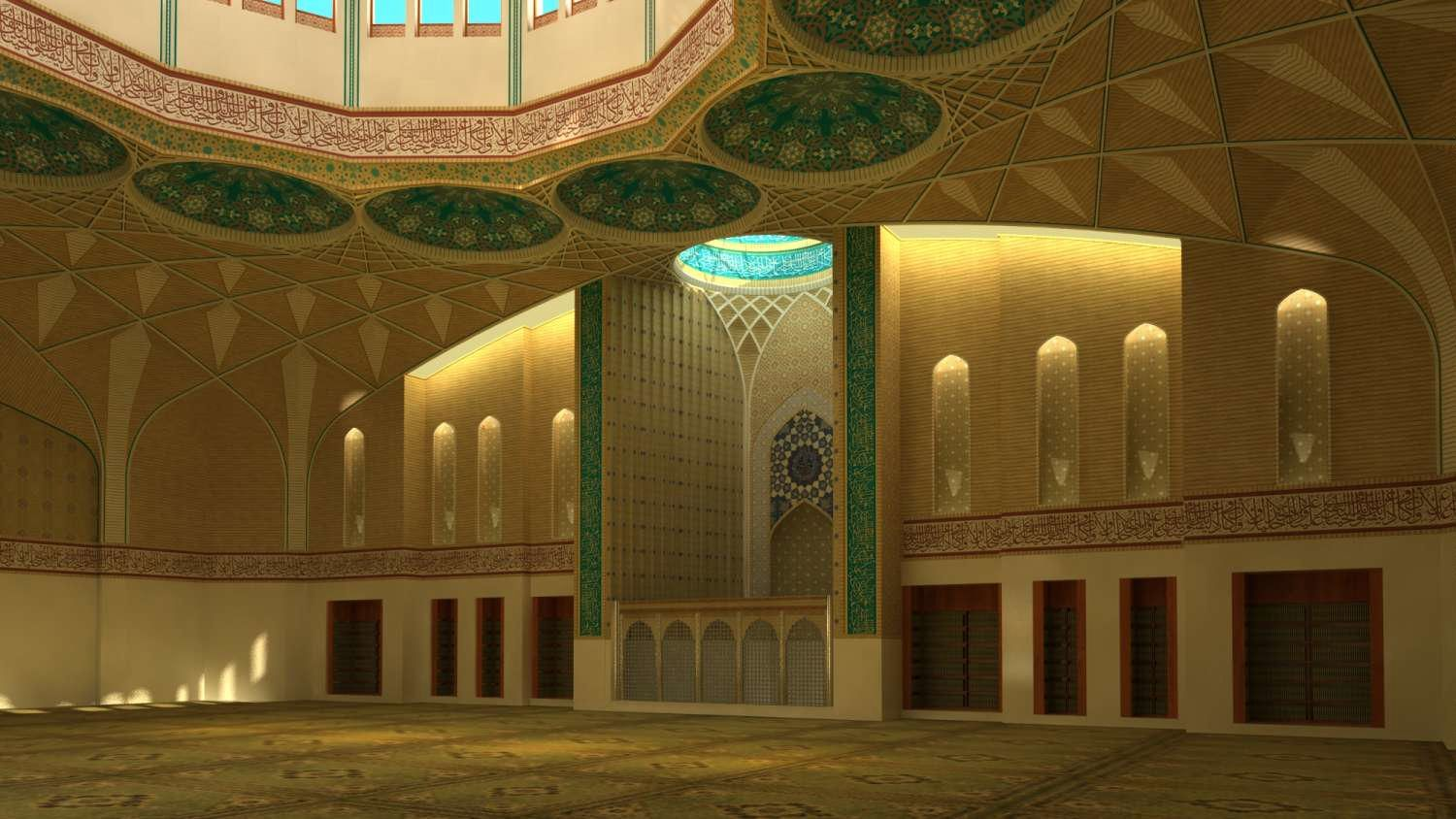

== See also ==
- Holiest sites in Shia Islam
- List of mosques in Iraq
- List of oldest mosques
- Shia Islam in Iraq
