= Holiest sites in Shia Islam =

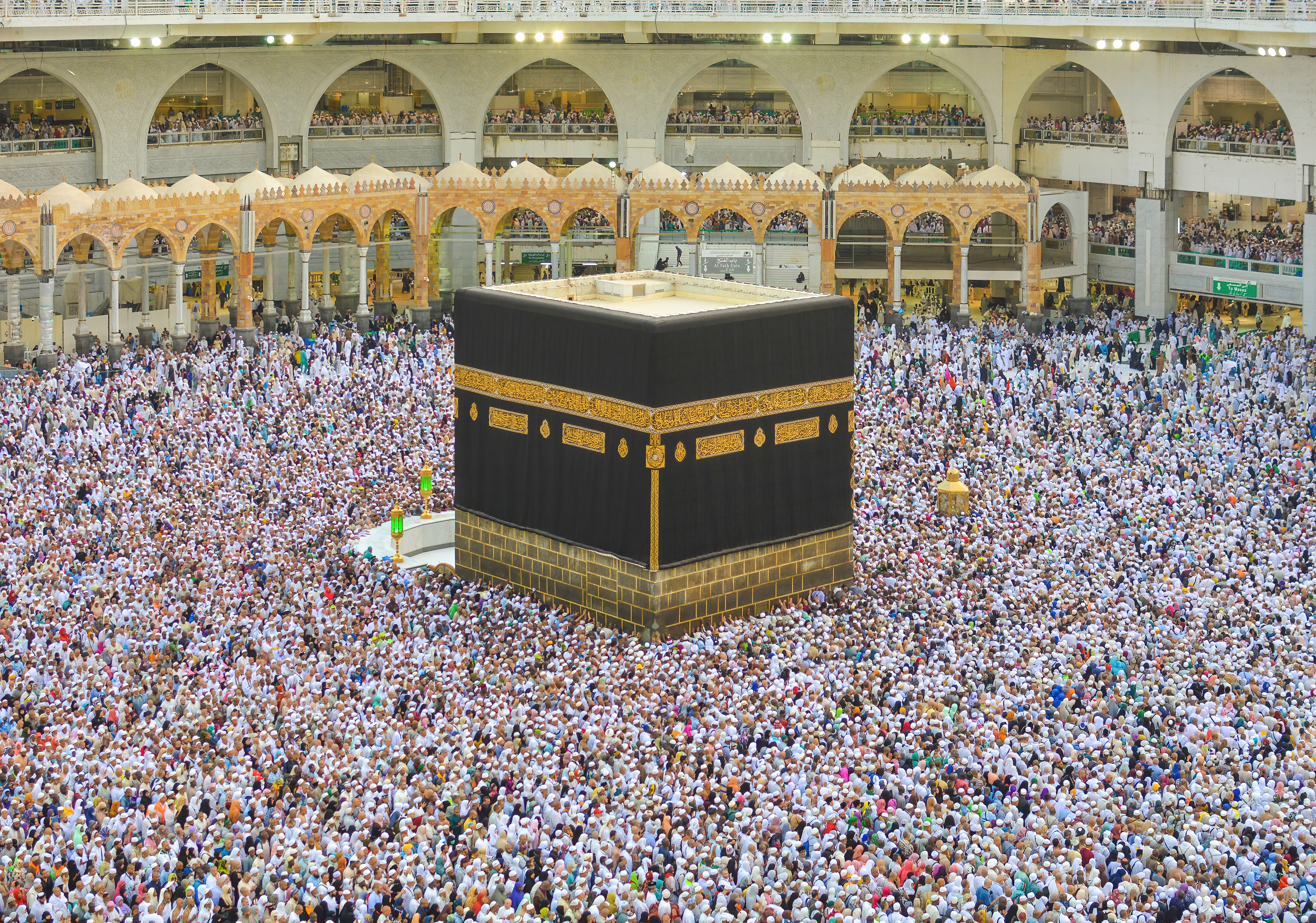
The Sacred Mosque in Makkah

Muslims, including Shia, Sunni, Ibadi and other branches, agree on two holiest sites in Islam being the Masjid al-Haram (including the Kaaba) in Mecca; the Masjid an-Nabawi in Medina.

Sites associated with the Islamic prophet Muhammad, his daughter Fatima and son-in-law Ali, the respective Shia Imams descended from them and their family members (collectively referred to as Ahl al-Bayt) are considered holy by the different Shia Muslim sects. Karbala and Najaf in Iraq are two of holiest cities revered by all Shia sects. Additionally, Mashhad and Qom in Iran are two of the holiest cities to Twelver Shia, the largest Shia sect.

== Holy sites accepted by all Muslims ==
=== Kaaba ===
Kaaba (Arabic: The Cube) is the most sacred site in Islam. It is surrounded by Masjid-al-Haram. During the Hajj period, the mosque is unable to contain the multitude of pilgrims, who pray on the outlining streets. More than 2 million worshippers gather to pray during Eid prayers.

And when We assigned to Ibrahim the place of the House, saying: Do not associate with Me aught, and purify My House for those who make the circuit and stand to pray and bow and prostrate themselves.

— Quran, surah 22 (Al-Hajj), ayah 26

And when Ibrahim and Ismail raised the foundations of the House: Our Lord! accept from us; surely Thou art the Hearing, the Knowing:

— Quran, surah 2 (Al-Baqara), ayah 127

=== Masjid Nabawi ===
The Prophet's Mosque in Medina, Saudi Arabia, is the second holiest site in Islam. Muhammad himself was involved in the construction of the mosque. One of the most notable parts of the mosque is its Green Dome, where the tomb of Muhammad is located. For Shi'a Muslims, this is the main place to perform Ziyarat on Muhammad.

=== Masjid Al-Aqsa ===
Al-Aqsa in Jerusalem, also known as the Haram al-Sharif or the Temple Mount, is where Muhammad ascended bodily into heaven. It is the third-holiest site in Islam, held in esteem by all Muslims due to its history as a place of worship by many prophets such as Abraham, David, Solomon, Elijah and Jesus.

== Shrines of the Imams ==
=== Imam Ali Shrine ===
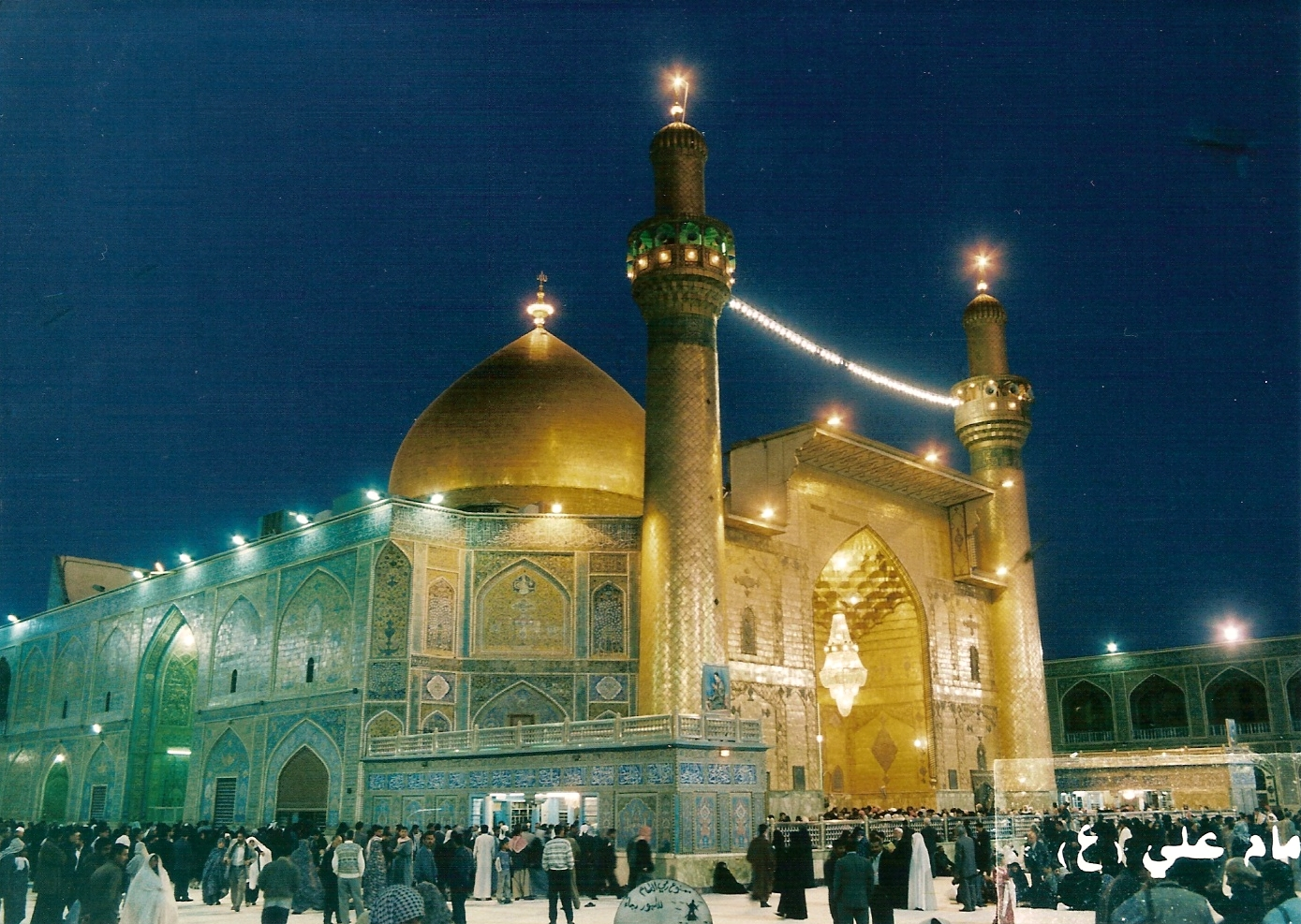
Imam Ali Mosque in Najaf, Iraq

The Imam Ali Shrine in Najaf is considered the holiest, which contains the tomb of Ali. He was the cousin and son-in-law of Muhammad. Ali is considered by Shia tradition to be the first legitimate caliph and the first imam due to the proclamation given by Muhammad. The site is visited annually by at least 8 million pilgrims on average, which is estimated to increase to 20 million in years to come. Adam and Noah are also buried within this mosque according to Shia Islam.

Many Shia believe that Ali did not want his grave to be desecrated by his enemies and consequently asked his friends and family to bury him secretly. This secret gravesite is supposed to have been revealed later during the Abbasid Caliphate by Ja'far al-Sadiq who is considered by Shia Muslims to be the sixth Shia imam. Most Shias accept that Ali is buried in the Imam Ali Mosque which is now the city of Najaf.

Ja'far al-Sadiq, the sixth Shia imam, said that the Imam Ali Mosque is the third of five holy places: Mecca, Medina, Imam Ali Mosque in Najaf, Imam Husayn Shrine in Karbala, and the shrine of Fatima Masumeh in Qom.

God chose that land [Najaf] as the abode of the Prophets. I swear to God that no one more honourable than the Commander of the Believers [Ali] has ever lived there after (the time of) his purified fathers, Ādam and Nūh.

— Ja'far al-Sadiq

=== Imam Husayn Shrine ===
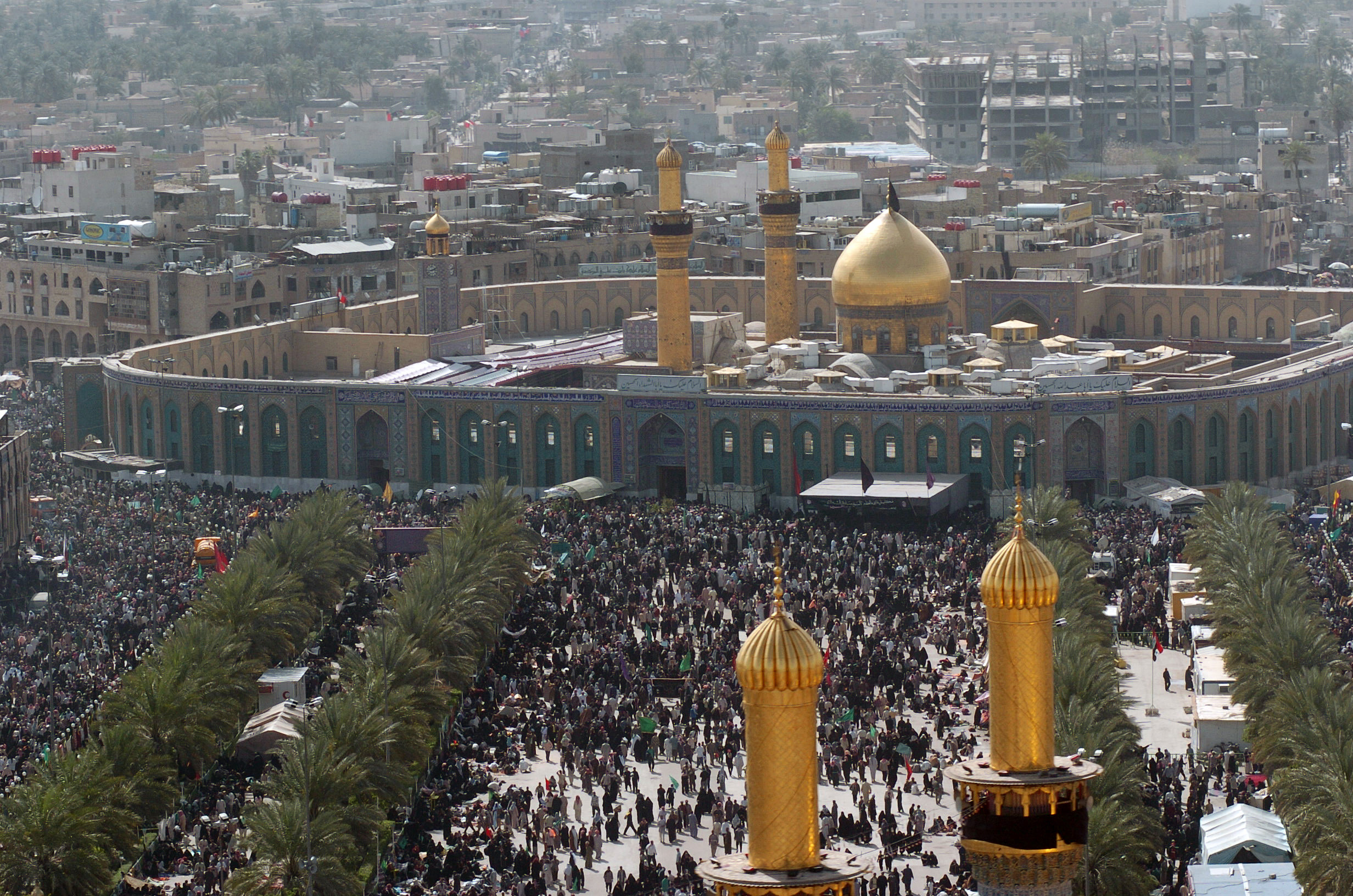
Imam Husayn Shrine in Karbala. Two tall minarets of Al-Abbas Shrine are also seen in the picture.

Imam Husayn Shrine in Karbala is the second holiest site for Shia Muslims. It contains the tomb of Husayn, the third Shia imam. It also contains the tombs of Ali al-Akbar ibn Husayn, Ali al-Asghar ibn Husayn, sons of Husayn; Ibrahim al-Mujab, grandson of Musa al-Kadhim and the martyrs of Karbala.

The mosque stands on the site of the grave of Husayn ibn Ali, where he was martyred during the Battle of Karbala in 680. Millions of pilgrims visit the city to observe the anniversary of Husayn ibn Ali's death. There are many Shia traditions which narrate the status of Karbala:

Karbalā, where your grandson and his family will be killed, is the most blessed and the most sacred land on Earth and it is one of the valleys of Paradise.

— The archangel Gabriel

God chose the land of Karbalā as a safe and blessed sanctuary twenty-four thousand years before He created the land of the Ka'bah and chose it as a sanctuary. Verily it [Karbalā] will shine among the gardens of Paradise, like a shining star shines among the stars for the people of Earth.

— Ali ibn al-Husayn

Not one night passes in which Gabriel and Michael do not go to visit him [Husayn].

— Ja'far al-Sadiq

=== Al-Baqi ===
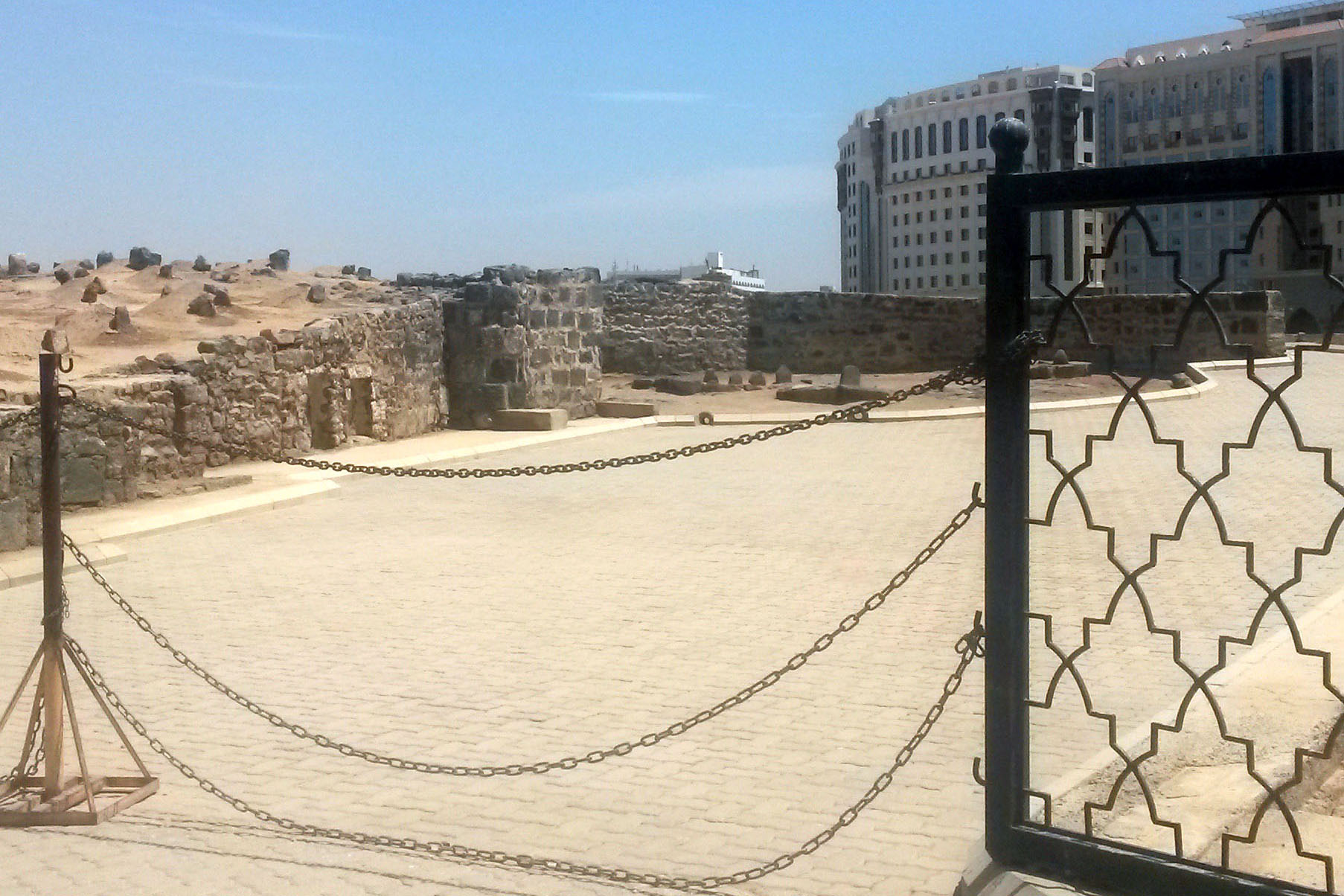
Al-Baqi cemetery in Medina

Al-Baqi (Jannat al-Baqī) is a cemetery located across from Al-Masjid al-Nabawi in Medina, Saudi Arabia. It is the oldest and first Islamic cemetery. It is particularly important to Shi'as as it is the burial place for 4–5 of their Imams.

- Shia imams:
  - Hasan ibn Ali (first grandson of Muhammad and 2nd Shi'a Imam)
  - Ali ibn Husayn Zayn al-Abidin (4th Twelver Imam)
  - Muhammad al-Baqir (5th Twelver/Isma'ili Imam)
  - Ja'far al-Sadiq (6th Twelver/Isma'ili Imam)
  - Isma'il ibn Ja'far (Isma'ili)
- Relatives of Shia figures:
- Fatimah bint Asad – mother of Ali
- Umm al-Banin – mother of Abbas ibn Ali
- Bibi Shahrbānū – mother of Ali ibn Husayn Zayn al-Abidin
- Halimah bint Abi Dhuayb – wet nurse of Muhammad

=== Al-Kadhimiya Mosque ===
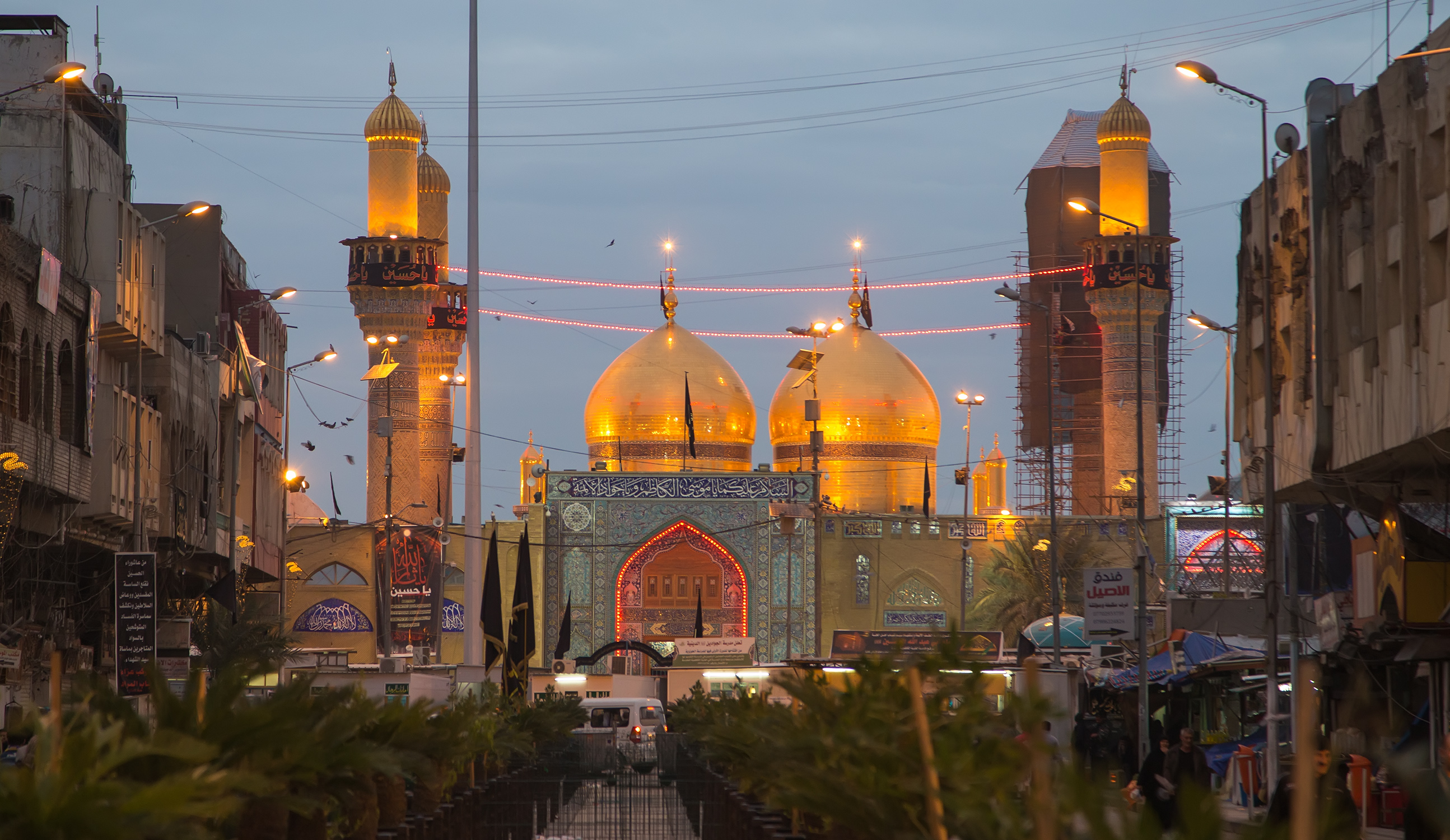
Al-Kadhimiya Mosque in Baghdad

The Al-Kadhimiya Mosque in Baghdad, Iraq contains the tombs of Musa al-Kadhim, seventh Shia imam and Muhammad al-Jawad, ninth Shia imam. Some consider the mosque the third holiest in Shia Islam.

=== Imam Reza Shrine ===
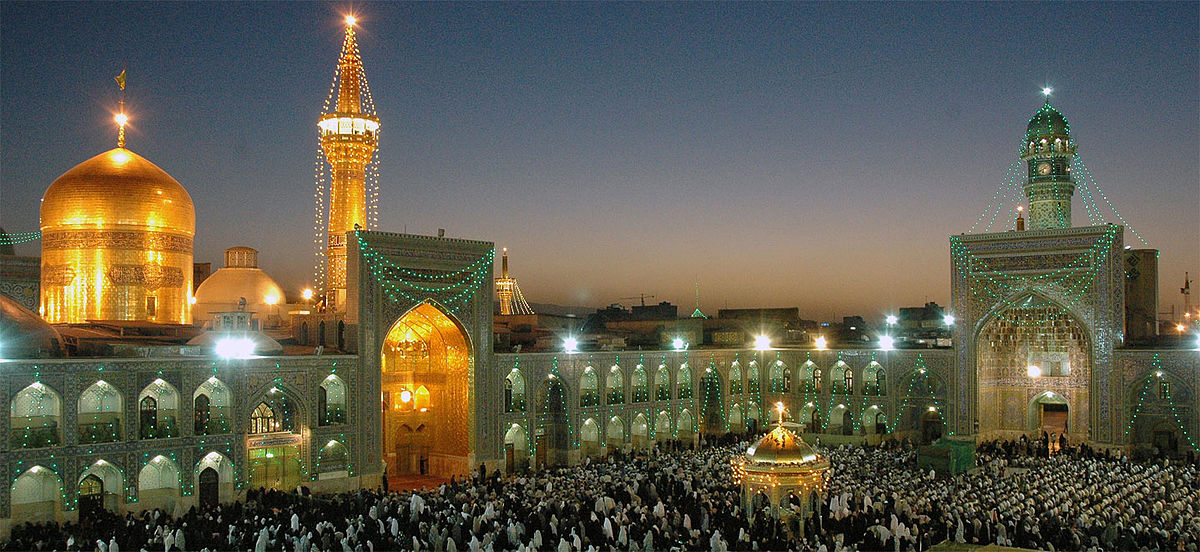
Imam Reza Shrine in Mashhad, Iran. It is the world's third-largest mosque after Masjid al-Haram in Mecca and the Prophet's Mosque in Medina. 30 Million Muslims visit the shrine each year, the most visited site in Islam.

Imam Reza Shrine in Mashhad, Iran is the third holiest site for Shia Muslims, which contains the tomb of Ali al-Ridha, the eighth Shia imam. Ali al-Ridha is believed, by members of the Shia, to have been poisoned there upon the orders of Caliph Al-Ma'mun and the place was subsequently called, Mashhad ar-Ridhā (the place of martyrdom of Ali al-Ridha). By the end of the 9th century a dome was built on the grave and many buildings and bazaars sprang up around it. For years totalling more than a millennium, the mosque was destroyed and reconstructed several times.

Today, Several important theological schools are associated with the shrine of the eighth imam. As a city of great religious significance, it is also a place of pilgrimage. Those who complete the pilgrimage to Mecca receive the title of haji, those who make the pilgrimage to Mashhad—and especially to the Imam Ridha shrine—are known as mashtee, a term employed also of its inhabitants. Over 25 million Muslims a year make the pilgrimage to Mashhad. It is generally considered to be the holiest Shia shrine in Iran. Shia sources quote several hadiths from the Shia Imams and Muhammad that highlight the importance of pilgrimage to the shrine. A hadith from Muhammad says:

One of my own flesh and blood will be buried in the land of Khorasan. God the Highest will surely remove the sorrows of any sorrowful person who goes on pilgrimage to his shrine. God will surely forgive the sins of any sinful person who goes on pilgrimage to his shrine.

=== Al-Askari Shrine ===
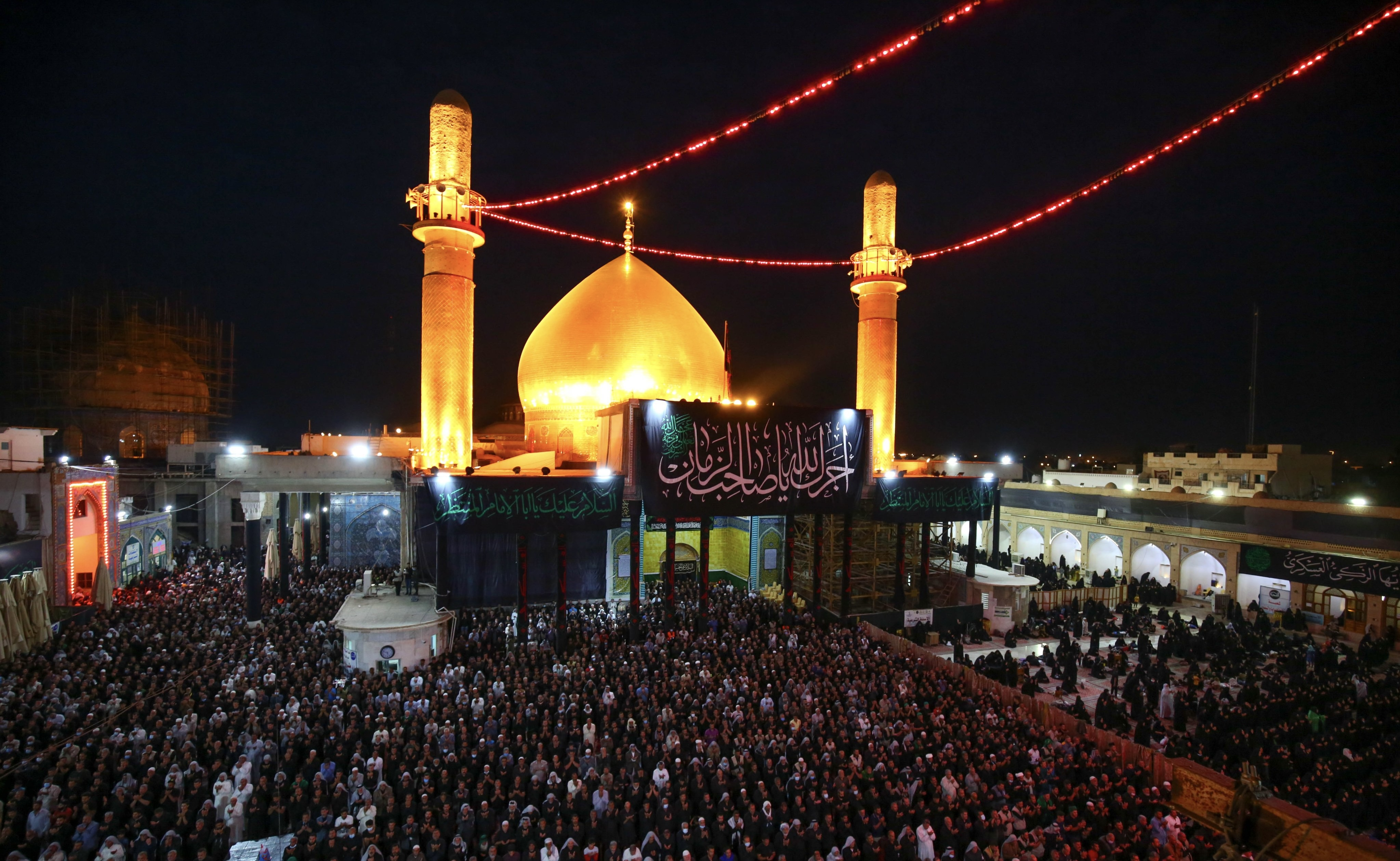
Al-Askari Shrine of the 10th and 11th Twelver Shia imams

The Al-Askari Shrine in Samarra, Iraq contains the tombs of Ali al-Hadi, tenth Shia imam and Hasan al-Askari, eleventh Shia imam. Hakimah Khātūn, sister of Ali al-Hadi and Narjis, mother of Muhammad al-Mahdi are also buried within the mosque. The cellar from which the twelfth or "Hidden" imam, Muhammad al-Mahdi, disappeared from view is also found within this mosque.

At the time of the Al-Askari bombing in Samarra, it was reported that the mosque was one of Shia Islam's holiest sites, only exceeded by the shrines of Najaf and Karbala, making it the third holiest Shia site.

== Sites dedicated to other than the Imams ==
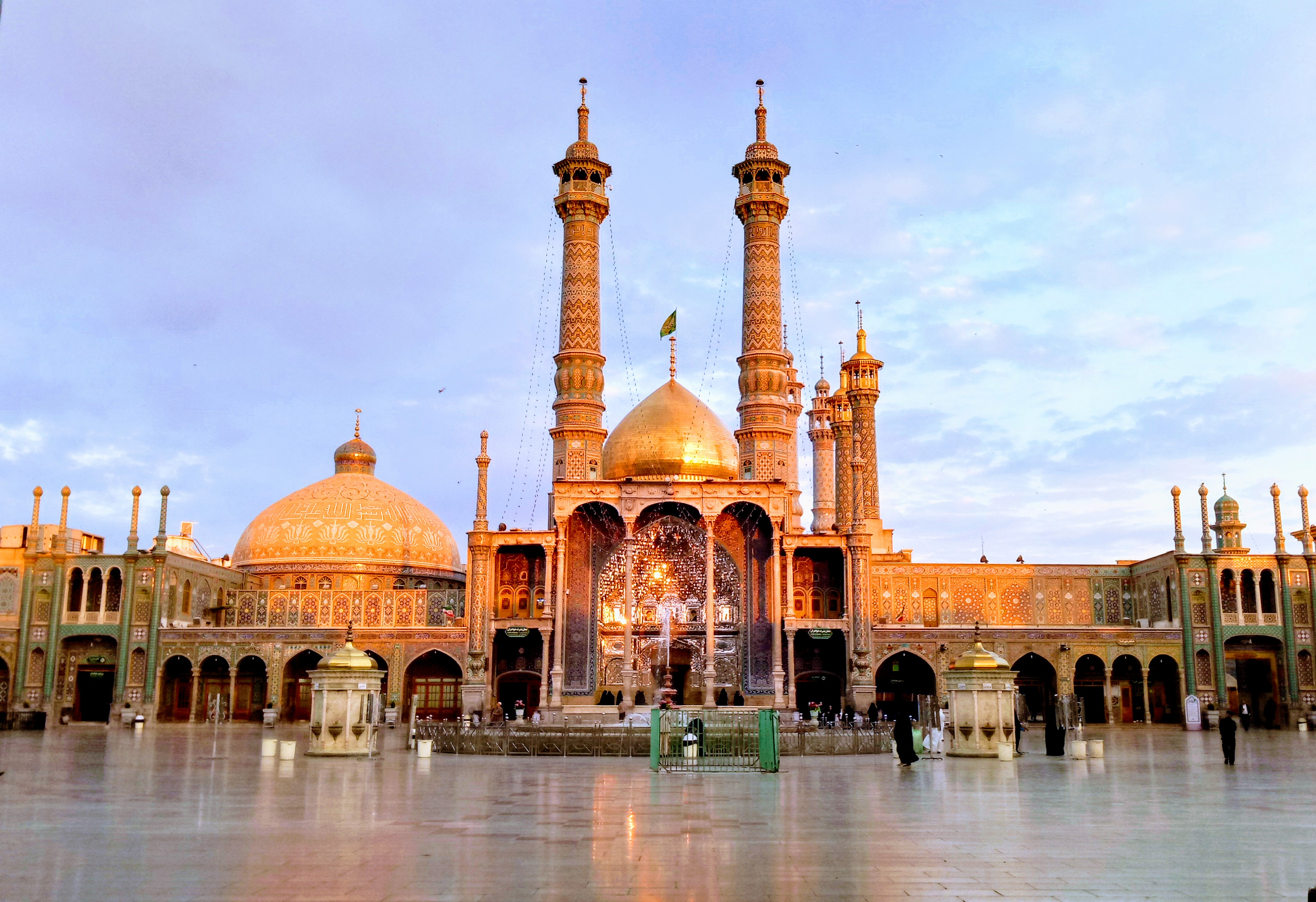
Fatima Masumeh Shrine in Qom

=== Fatima Masumeh Shrine ===
The Fatima Masumeh Shrine in Qom, Iran contains the tomb of Fatimah bint Musa, sister of the eighth Shia imam, Ali al-Ridha. It is the fourth holiest shrine in Shia Islam. The shrine has attracted to itself dozens of seminaries and religious schools.

=== Jamkaran Mosque ===
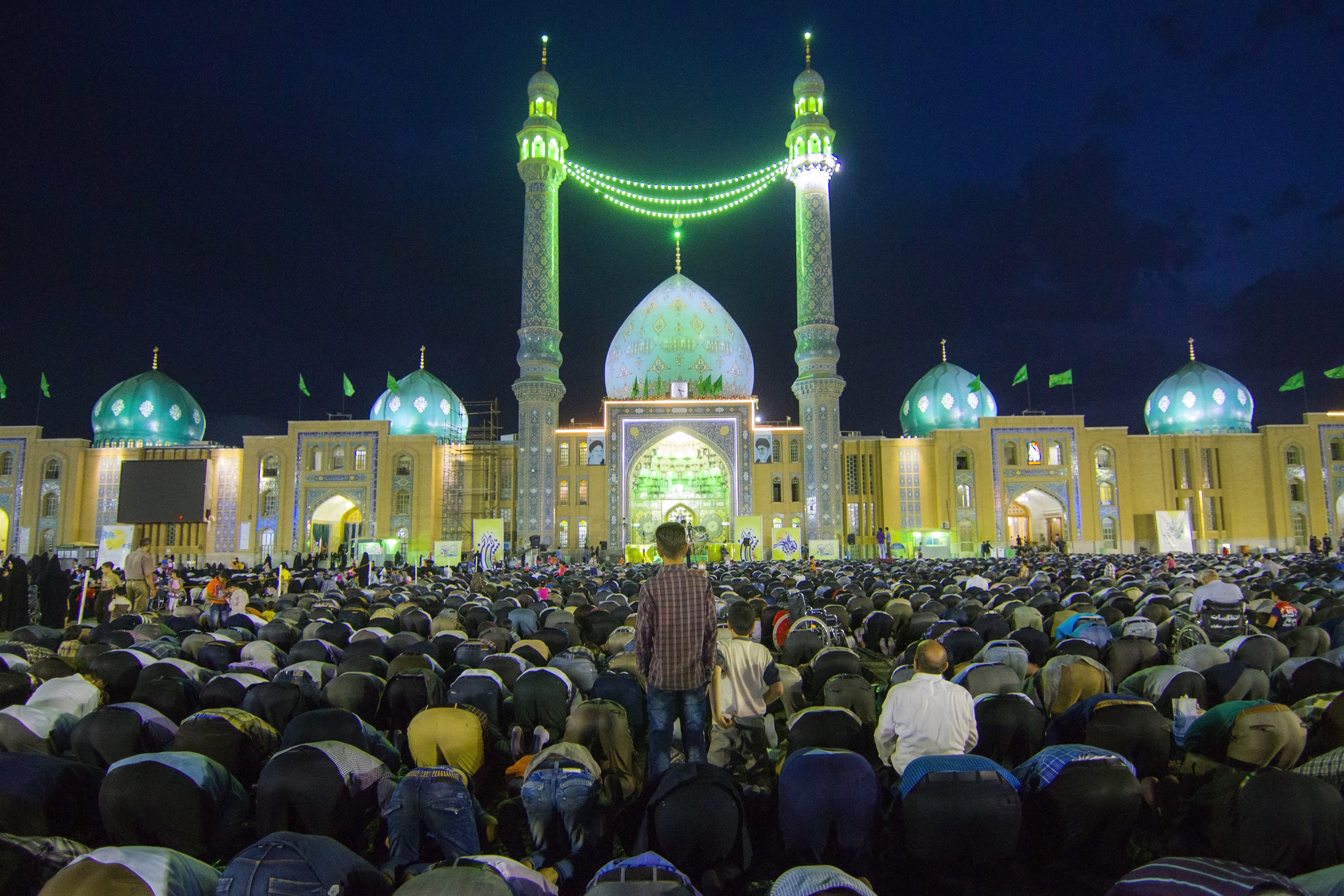
Jamkaran Mosque in Qom

The Jamkaran Mosque in Qom, Iran is one of the primary significant mosques in Jamkaran. Hassan ibn Muthlih Jamkarani is reported to have met the Shia's 12th imam, Muhammad al-Mahdi. In the rear of the mosque, there is a "well of requests (of prayers)" to be passed on to God (Allah). Pilgrims tie small strings in a knot around the grids covering the holy well, which they hope will be received by the Imam Mahdi.

=== Al-Sahlah Mosque ===
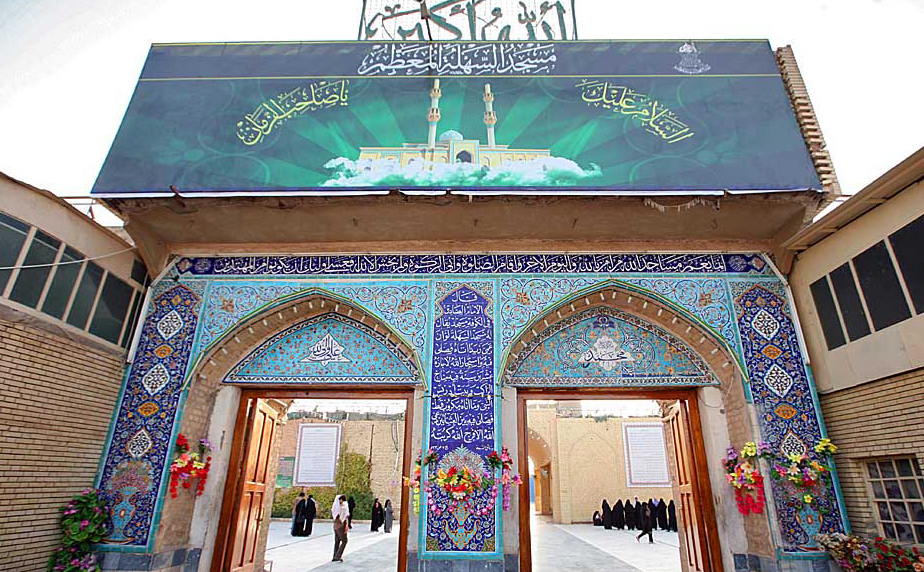
Al-Sahlah Mosque in Kufa, Iraq

The Al-Sahlah Mosque in Kufa, Iraq is said to be the future home of the Twelfth Shia imam, Muhammad al-Mahdi.

=== Sayyidah Zaynab Mosque ===
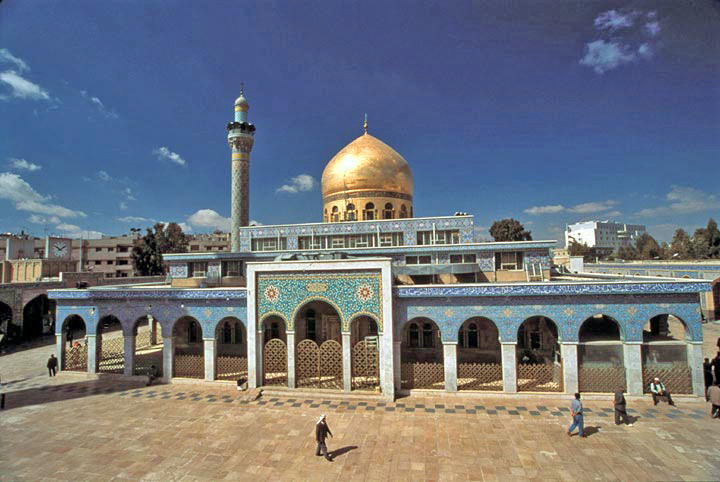
Sayyidah Zaynab Mosque in Damascus

The Sayyidah Zaynab Mosque in Damascus, Syria contains the tomb of Zaynab bint Ali, the daughter of Ali and Fatimah, and the granddaughter of Muhammad.

=== Al-Abbas Shrine ===
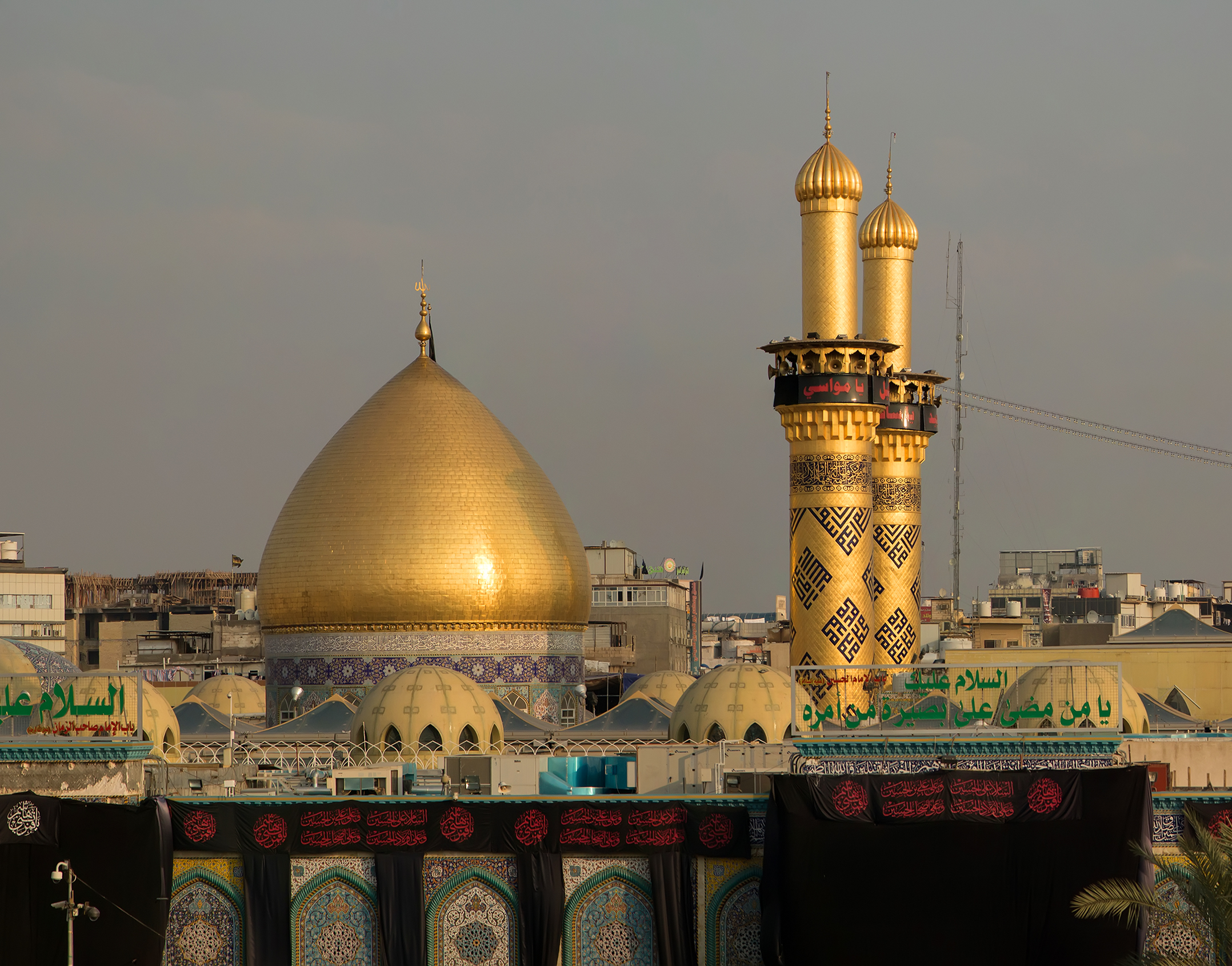
Al-Abbas Shrine in Karbala

The Al-Abbas Shrine is located directly across from the Imam Husayn Shrine, and contains the tomb of Abbas ibn Ali, son of Ali and brother of Husayn.

Millions of pilgrims visit the shrine and pay homage to it every year. The real grave of Abbas is beneath the masoulem, and is present in the shrine. Emperors and kings of various dynasties have offered valuable gifts and gems to the shrine of Abbas. It was designed by Persian and Central Asian architects. The central pear shaped dome is an ornately decorated structure. On its sides stand two tall minarets. The tomb is covered with pure gold and surrounded by a trellis of silver. Iranian carpets are rolled out on the floors.

=== Sayyidah Ruqayya Mosque ===
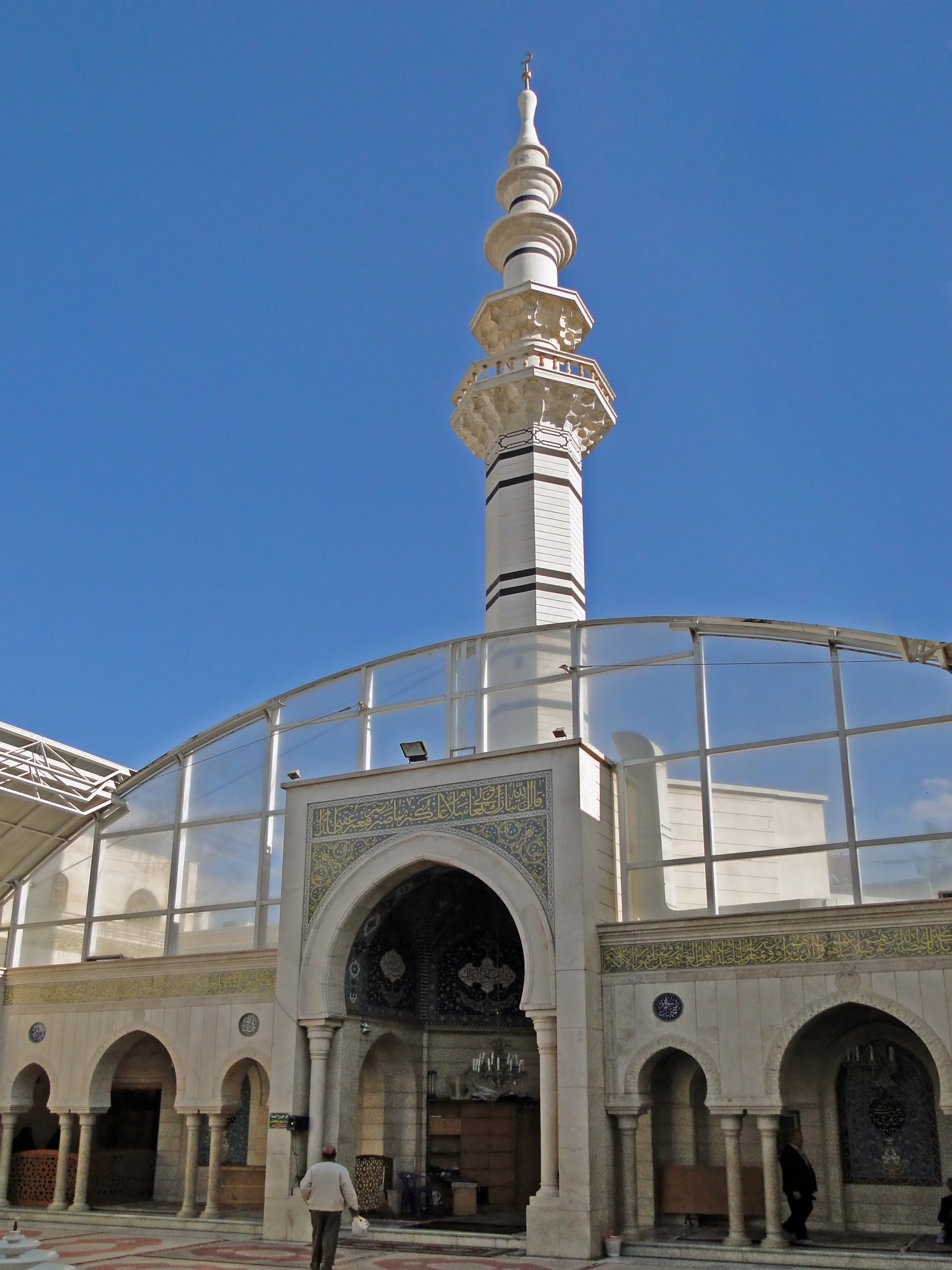
Sayyidah Ruqayya Mosque in Damascus

The Sayyidah Ruqayya Mosque in Damascus, Syria contains the tomb of Sukayna bint Husayn, the youngest daughter of Husayn ibn Ali, often referred to by her title: "Ruqayya".

=== Mosques associated with companions of Muhammad and the Shia imams ===
- Tomb of Salman the Persian, Hudhayfah ibn al-Yaman, Jabir ibn Abd Allah and Tahir ibn Muhammad al-Baqir in Al-Mada'in, Iraq
- Uwais al-Qarni Mosque in Raqqa, Syria. It contains graves of Uwais al-Qarni and Ammar ibn Yasir.
- Tomb of Maytham al-Tammar in Kufa, Iraq

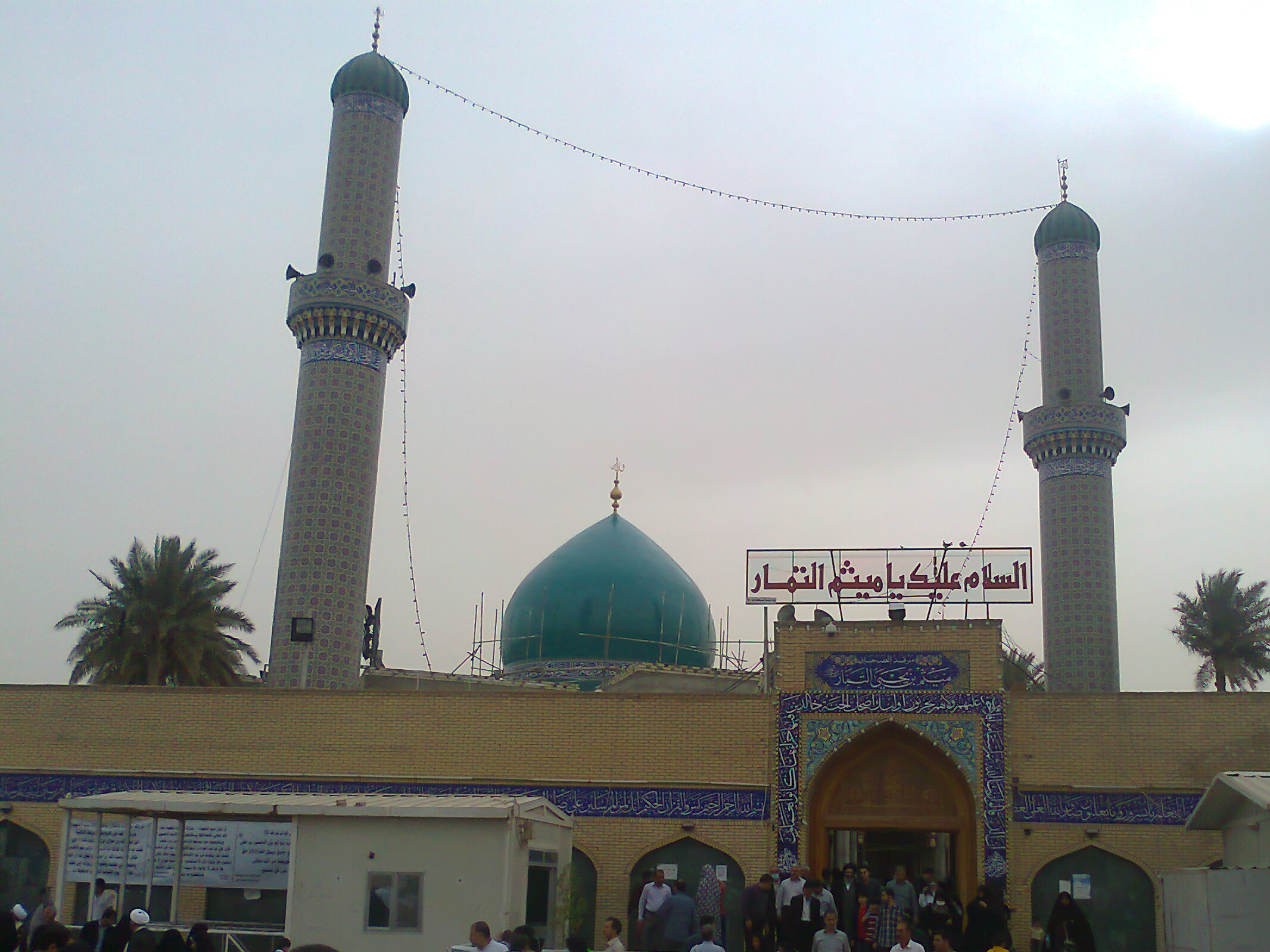
Shrine of Maytham al-Tammar in Kufa

- Tomb of Kumayl ibn Ziyad in Kufa, Iraq

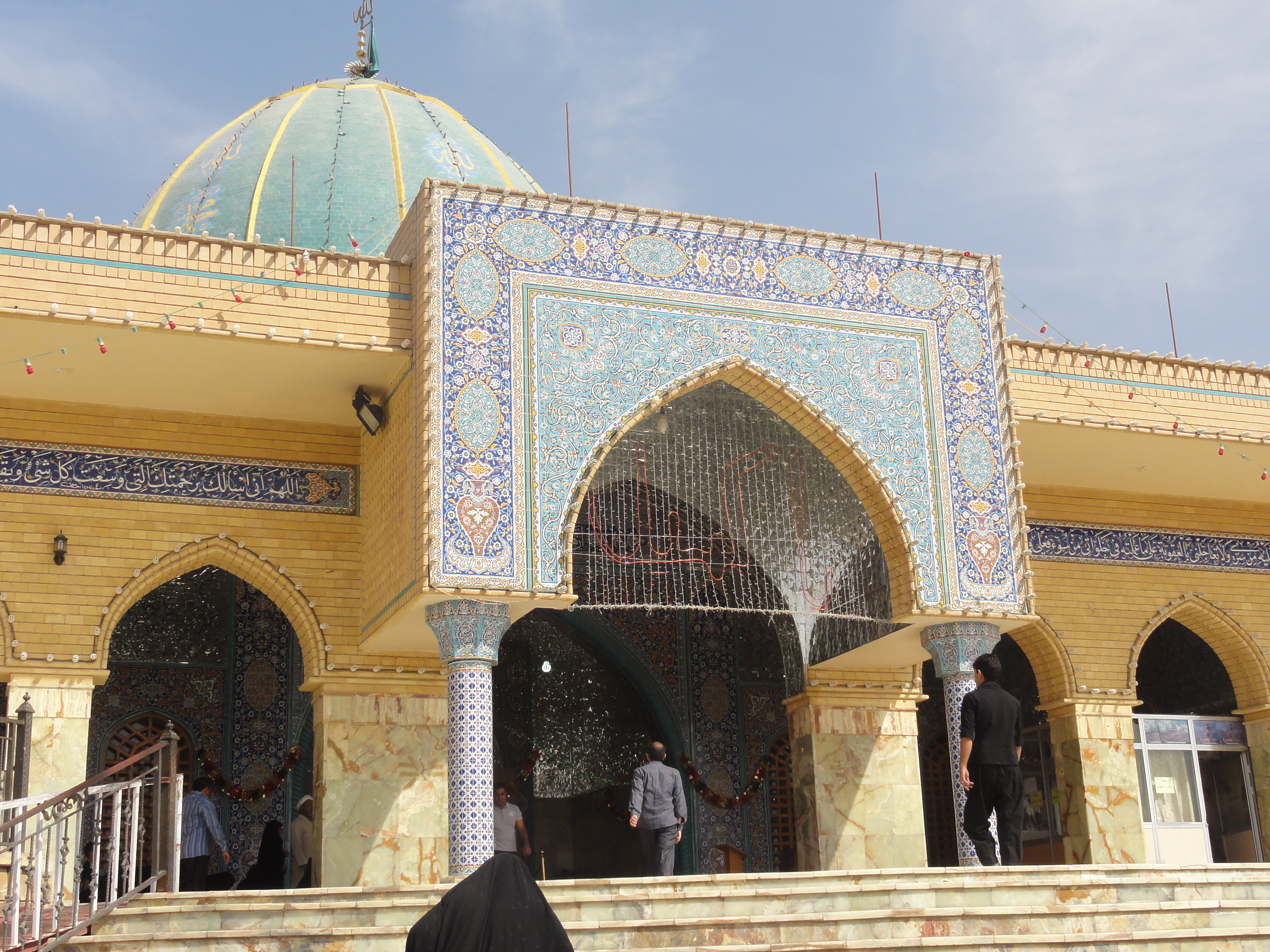
Shrine of Kumayl ibn Ziyad in Al-Hannanah Mosque

- Hujr ibn Adi Mosque in Adra' (north of Damascus), Syria
- Shrine of Malik al-Ashtar in Egypt. He was one of the most loyal companions of Ali.
- Tomb of Al-Hurr ibn Yazid Al-Tamimi companion of Imam Husayn, who was martyred in Battle of Karbala.
- Other several tombs and graves of companions in Iraq, Iran, Saudi Arabia, Palestine, Egypt and Yemen
- Al-Hannanah Mosque in Kufa, Iraq – contains some of the skin of Husayn ibn Ali which was ripped off of him post-mortem by the aggressors of Battle of Karbala.
- Tombs of Ja'far ibn Abi Talib also known as Ja'far al-Tayyar, cousin of Muhammad and brother of Ali, and Zayd ibn Harithah after their martyrdom during the Battle of Mu'tah, located in Mu'tah in Jordan.
- Al-Nuqtah Mosque in Aleppo, Syria – this mosque contains a large stone where the head of Husayn ibn Ali was placed, while on a stop-over along the journey from Karbala to Damascus.
- Shrine of Husayn's Head (destroyed in 1950) – this mosque contained the head of Husayn ibn Ali for about two centuries in the middle ages

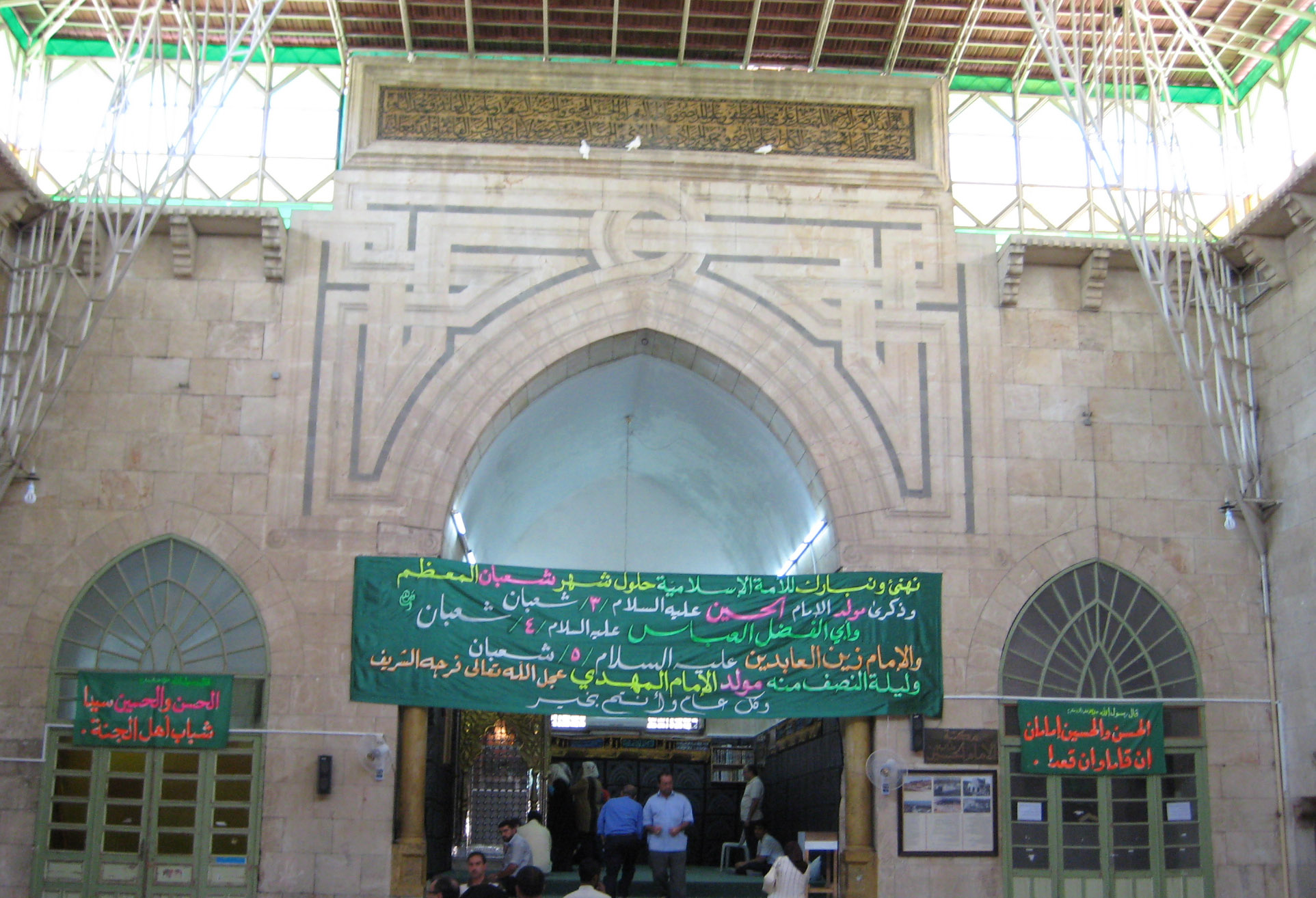
Al-Nuqtah Mosque in Aleppo

=== Tombs of other family members of Muhammad ===
- Imamzadeh in Ganja, Azerbaijan – bears the grave of one of the sons of Muhammad al-Baqir.
- Shrine of Muhammad ibn Ali al-Hadi in Balad, Iraq – entombs the remains of Muhammad ibn Ali al-Hadi, son of Ali al-Hadi
- Imamzadeh Saleh in Shemiran, Tehran, Iran – entombs the remains of Saleh, son of Musa al-Kadhim
- Shah Abdol-Azim Shrine in Rey, Iran – entombs the remains of Abdul Azim, descendant of Hasan ibn Ali. The mosque also contains the tombs of a son of Ali ibn al-Husayn and a son of Musa al-Kadhim.

Shah Abdol-Azim Shrine in Rey

- Shah Cheragh in Shiraz, Iran – entombs the remains of Ahmad and Muhammad, sons of Musa al-Kadhim
- Imamzadeh Seyed Morteza in Kashmar, Iran – entombs another son of Musa al-Kadhim
- Imamzadeh Hamzah, Tabriz in Tabriz, Iran – entombs another son of Musa al-Kadhim
- Imamzadeh Hamzeh, Kashmar in Kashmar, the tomb of Hamzah al-Hamzah ibn Musa al-Kadhim

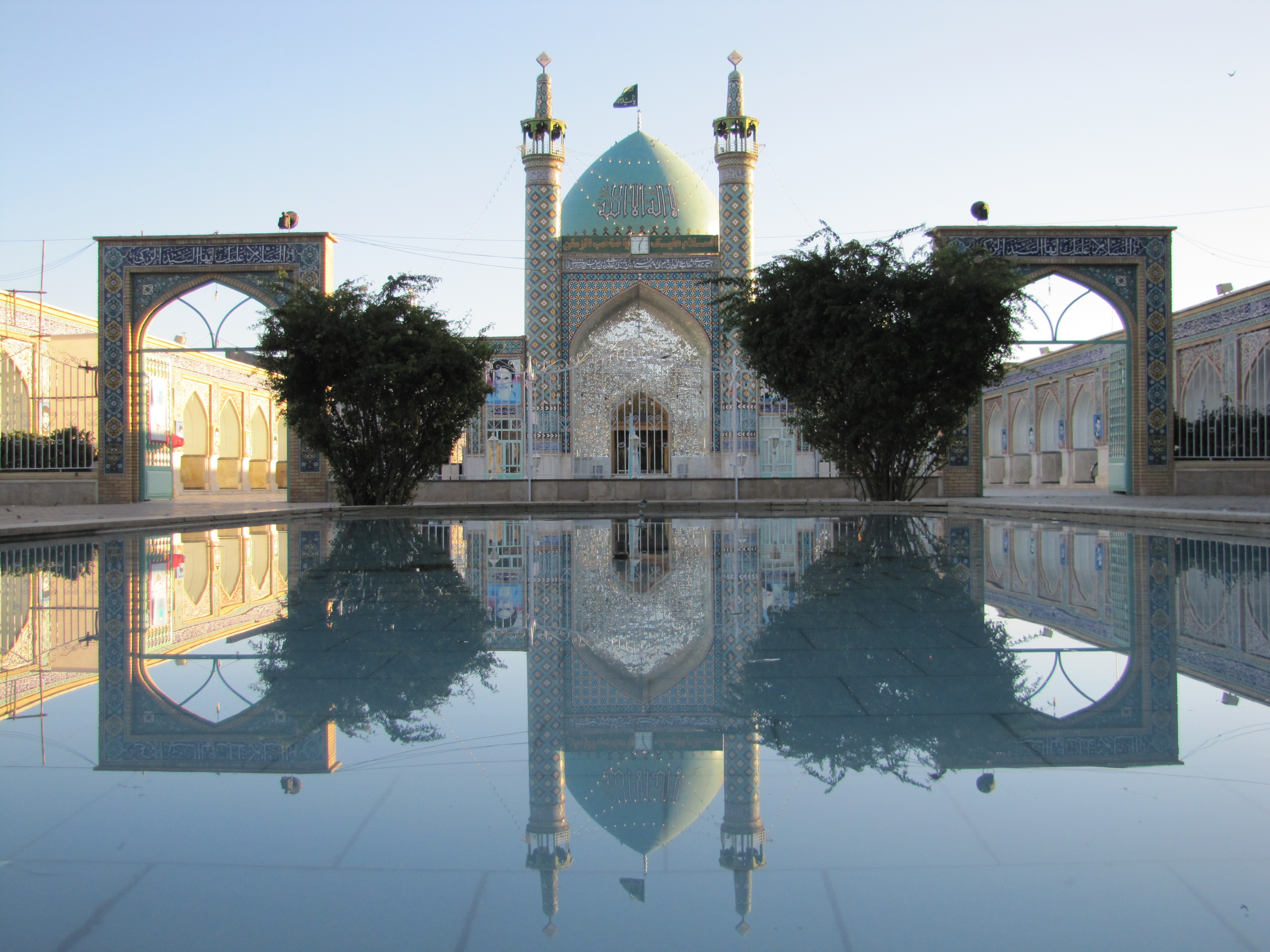
Imamzadeh Hamzeh, Kashmar

- Shrine of Sultan Ali in Mashhad Ardehal, Iran – entombs the remains of Sultan Ali, son of Muhammad al-Baqir
- Shrine of Qutham ibn Abbas in Shah-i-Zinda, Samarkand, Uzbekistan – the cousin of Muhammad
- Various imamzadeh scattered throughout Iran and Iraq

== Holy sites specific to other Shia Muslims (non-Twelvers) ==
- Shrines of the Isma'ili imams, Hujjas and Da'i al-Mutlaqs – imams – see List of Isma'ili imams, Hujjas – Arwa al-Sulayhi, Nasir Khusraw and Da'is – see List of Dai of the Dawoodi Bohra.
- Shrines of the Isma'ili Da'is or Missionary – see List of Isma'ili missionaries.
- Ruins of the Isma'ili castles – see List of Isma'ili castles.

== Cemeteries ==
=== Jannat al-Mu'alla Cemetery ===
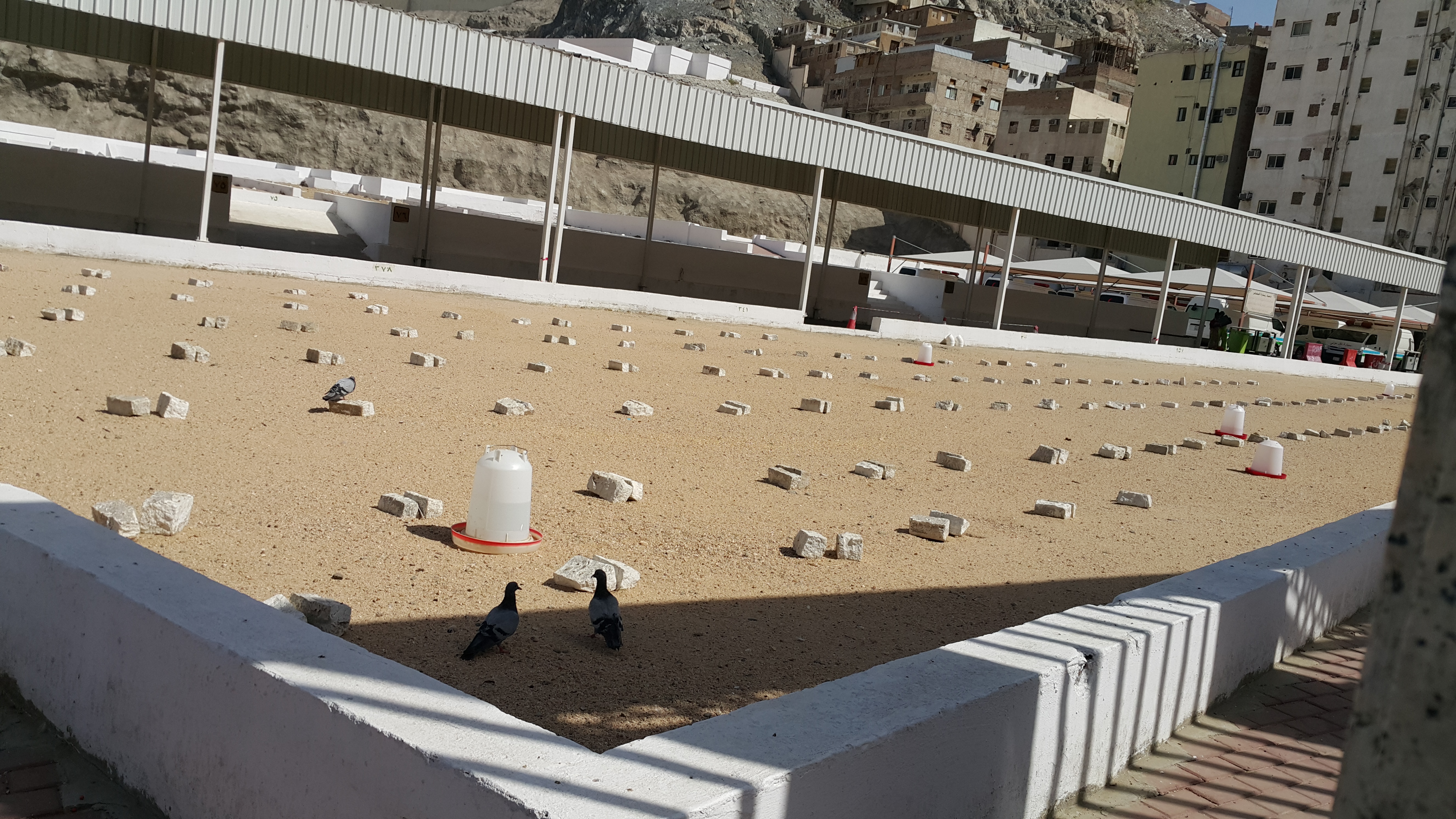
Jannat al-Mu'alla cemetery in Makkah

The Jannat al-Mu'alla cemetery in Mecca, Saudi Arabia contains the graves of many relatives of Muhammad, held in high esteem by the Shia, including:

- Abd Manaf ibn Qusai – great-great-grandfather of Muhammad
- Hashim ibn Abd Manaf – great-grandfather of Muhammad
- Abd al-Muttalib – grandfather of Muhammad
- Abu Talib ibn Abd al-Muttalib – uncle of Muhammad and father of the first Shia imam, Ali
- Khadija bint Khuwaylid – first wife of Muhammad and mother of Fatimah
- Qasim ibn Muhammad – son of Muhammad who died in his infancy
- Possible grave of Aminah bint Wahb – mother of Muhammad

=== Bab al-Saghir Cemetery ===
The Bab al-Saghir cemetery in Damascus, Syria contains the graves of many relatives of Muhammad as well as sites related to the Battle of Karbala. Some of the figures laid to rest here include:

- Umm Kulthum bint Ali – daughter of Ali and Fatimah, granddaughter of Muhammad
- Bilal ibn Rabah – the muezzin of Muhammad
- Hamīdah – daughter of Muslim ibn Aqil
- Maymūnah – daughter of Hasan ibn Ali
- Sakinah (Fatimah al-Kubra) bint Husayn – daughter of Husayn ibn Ali (not to be confused with Ruqayyah who was the youngest)
- Asma bint Umais – wife of Ja'far ibn Abi Talib and Ali
- Abdullah ibn Ali ibn Husayn – son of Ali ibn Husayn Zayn al-Abidin

=== Other tombs for the family of imams ===
There are many tombs of the various descendants of the imams (often called imamzadeh). Some of them include:

- Great Mosque of Kufa in Kufa, Iraq – contains the tombs of Muslim ibn Aqil, Khadijah bint Ali, Hani ibn Urwa, and Mukhtar al-Thaqafi. The mosque also contains many important sites relating to the prophets and Ali, including the place where he was fatally struck on the head while in Sujud. In Shi'a Islam, praying in the Great Mosque of Kufa is considered more rewarding than prayer in other places.
- Mount Uhud near Medina, Saudi Arabia – bears the grave of Hamza ibn Abdul-Muttalib the uncle of Muhammad, along with the graves of all the other Muslims who fell at the Battle of Uhud.
- The tomb of Zayd ibn Ali in Kufa, Iraq
- Muhammad ibn Muhammad ibn Zayd – a descendant of Ali ibn Husayn Zayn al-Abidin (grandson of Zayd ibn Ali) in Mashhad, Iran.
- Awlād Muslim Mosque in Musayyib, Iraq – entombs the remains of the sons of Muslim ibn Aqil.

== Tombs of Biblical prophets ==
- Nabi Habeel Mosque in Syria – contains the grave of Abel (Arabic: Habeel ), son of Adam and Eve as believed by many Muslims

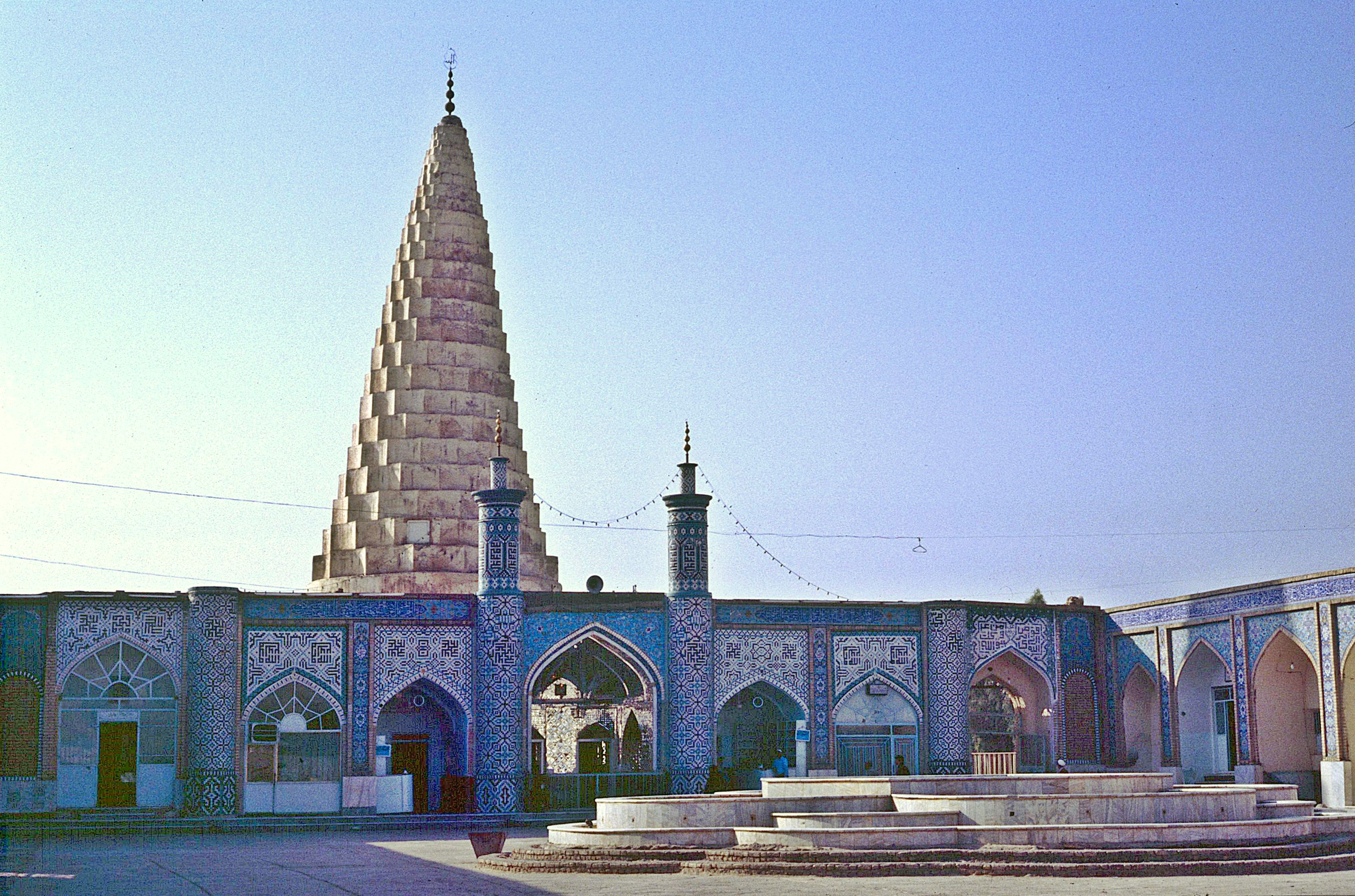
Tomb of Daniel in Susa

- Tomb of Daniel Daniel (Daniyal) who is considered to have been an Islamic prophet.
- Cave of the Patriarchs in Hebron, West Bank, Palestinian territories – contains the graves of Abraham and some of his family
- Al-Nabi Yusha' in Galilee, Palestine – Tomb of Joshua
- Great Mosque of Aleppo in Aleppo, Syria – entombs the remains of Zechariah, father of John the Baptist.
- Tombs of prophets in Iraq, Iran, Syria, Jordan, Palestine, and Saudi Arabia

=== Other places associated with Muhammad ===
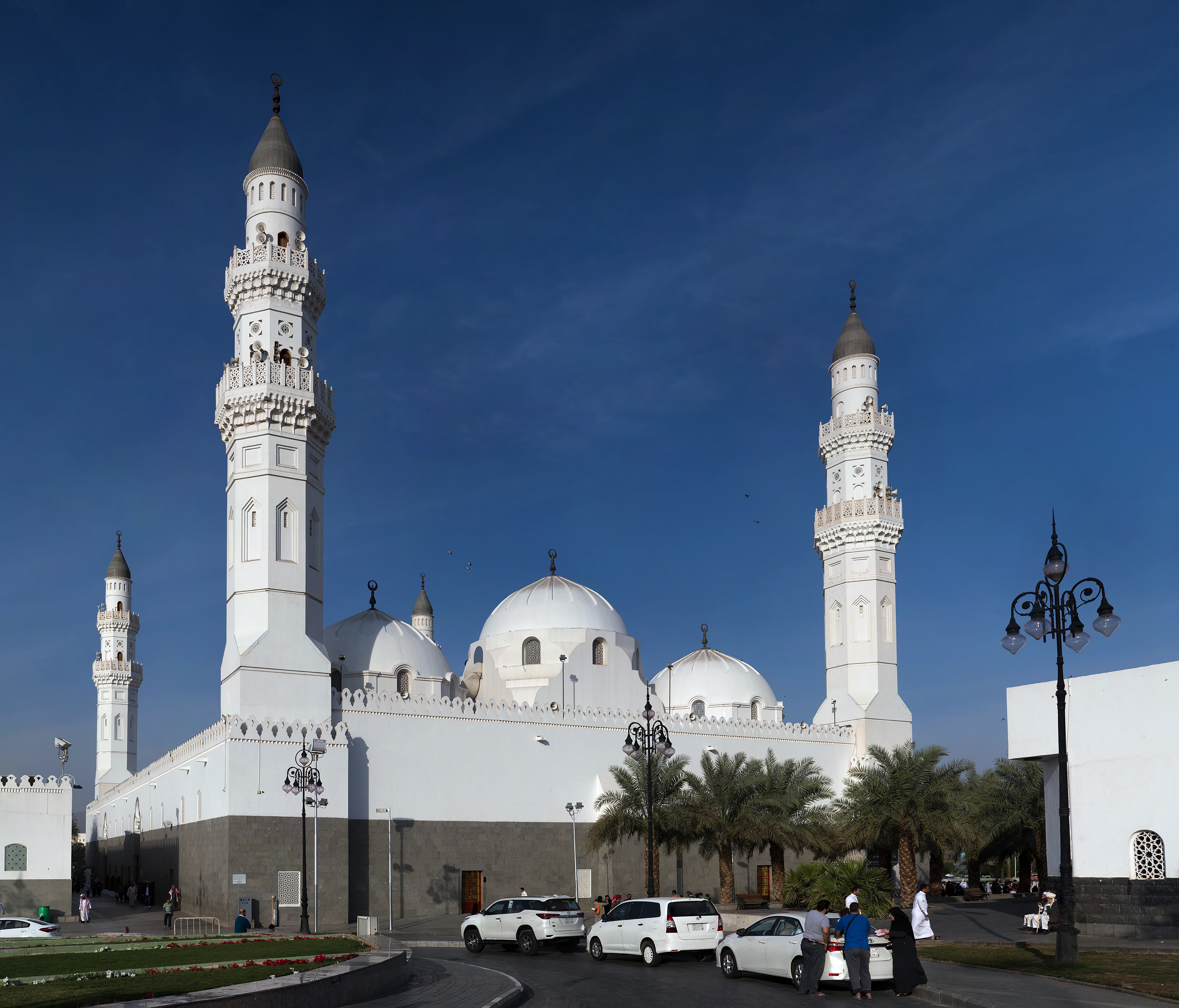
Quba Mosque in Medina

- Quba Mosque found just outside Medina, Saudi Arabia, was the first mosque ever built by Muhammad. Its first stones were positioned by Muhammad on his emigration from the city of Mecca to Medina and was subsequently completed by his companions. Muhammad then waited for Ali to arrive before he entered the city of Medina.
- Masjid al-Qiblatayn in Medina, Saudi Arabia – the mosque where the direction of prayer (qibla) was changed from Jerusalem to Mecca.
- Cave of Hira located on the mountain Jabal al-Nour in Saudi Arabia – the place where the first verses of the Quran were revealed to Muhammad

== See also ==
- Mukhtar al-Thaqafi
- Bayt al-Ahzan
- Holiest sites in Islam
- Ziyarat
