= Imamzadeh Seyed Morteza =

Shi'ite Imamzadeh in Kashmar, Iran

- امامزاده سید مرتضی
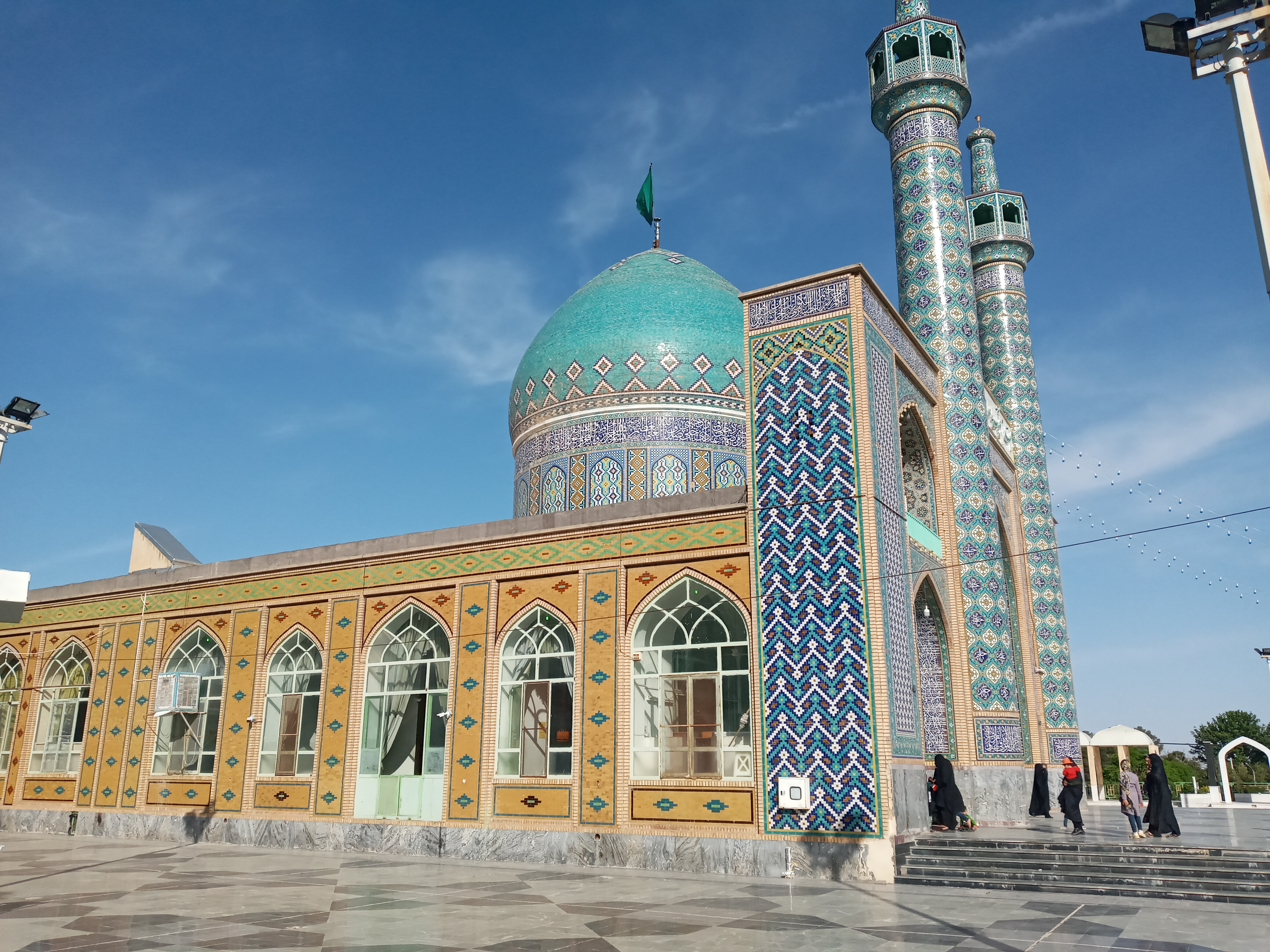
- The imamzadeh in 2021

- Location of the tomb in Iran

Religion
- Affiliation: Shia Islam
- Ecclesiastical or organisational status: Imamzadeh
- Status: Active

Location
- Location: Kashmar, Kashmar County, Razavi Khorasan province
- Country: Iran
- Coordinates: 35°17′14″N 58°28′28″E

Architecture
- Type: Islamic architecture
- Style: Qajar
- Completed: 1857 CE

Specifications
- Dome: One
- Minaret: Two
- Materials: Bricks; mortar

Iran National Heritage List
- Official name: Imamzadeh Morteza
- Type: Built
- Designated: 24 October 1977
- Reference no.: 1488
- Conservation organization: Cultural Heritage, Handicrafts and Tourism Organization of Iran

The Imamzadeh Seyed Morteza (Persian: امامزاده سید مرتضی; Arabic: مرقد مرتضى الكاظم), or simply Imamzadeh Morteza, is a Shia imamzadeh located in Kashmar, in the province of Razavi Khorasan, Iran. It was completed in 1857 CE, during the Qajar era.

The complex was added to the Iran National Heritage List on 24 October 1977, administered by the Cultural Heritage, Handicrafts and Tourism Organization of Iran.

== Gallery ==
Pictures of "Imamzadeh Seyed Morteza"
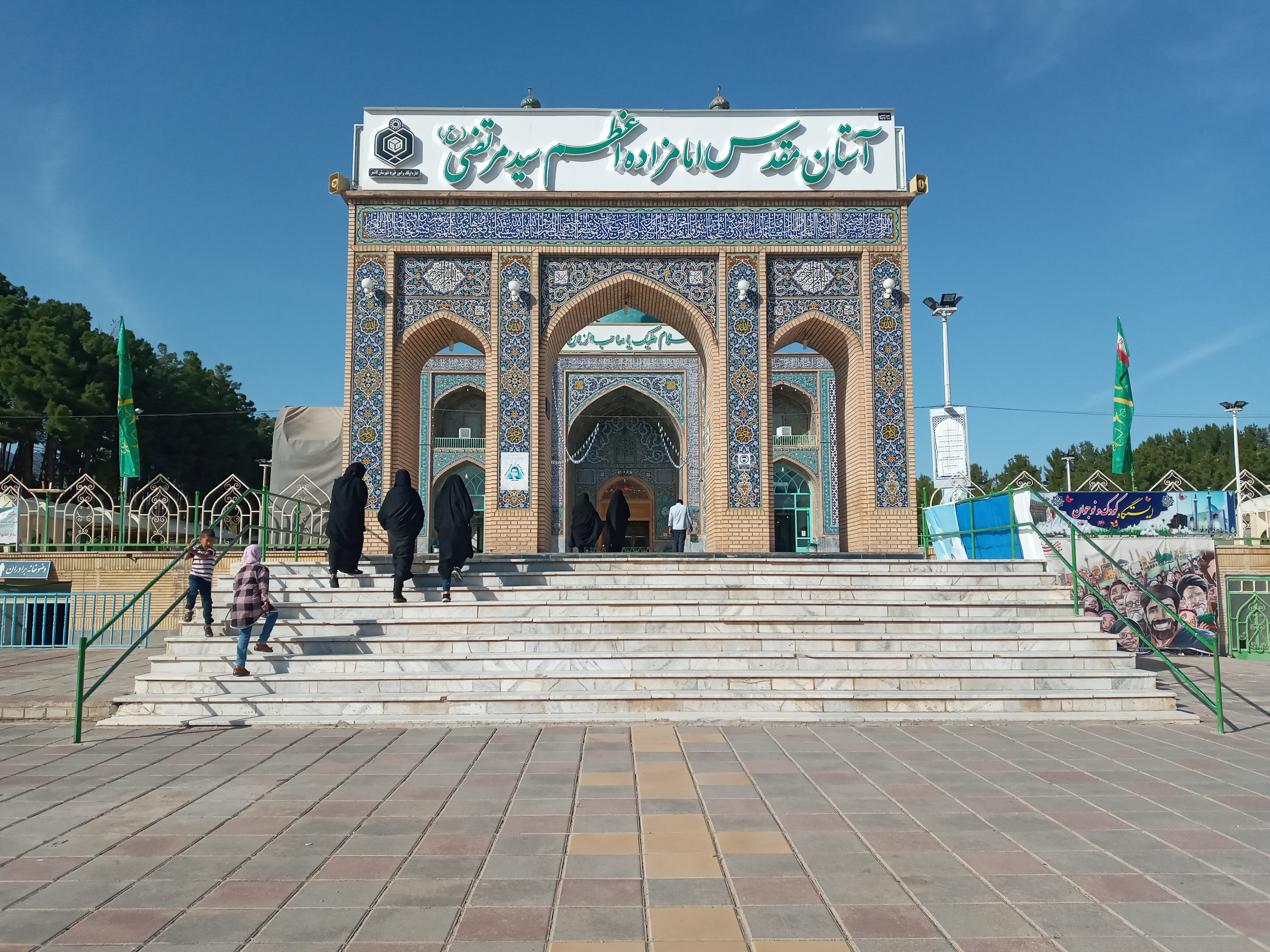
Imamzadeh Seyed Morteza entrance

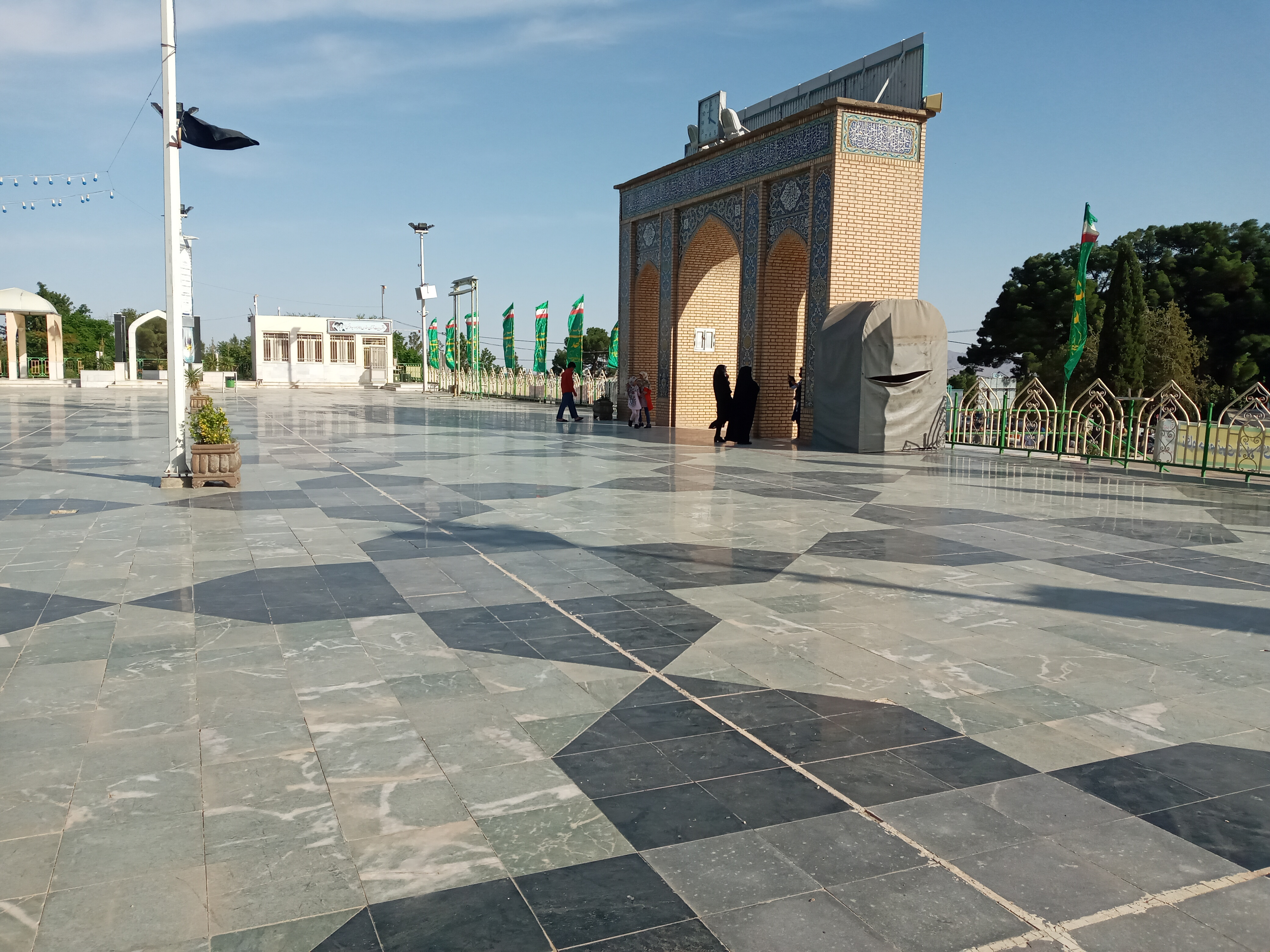
Imamzadeh Seyed Morteza yard

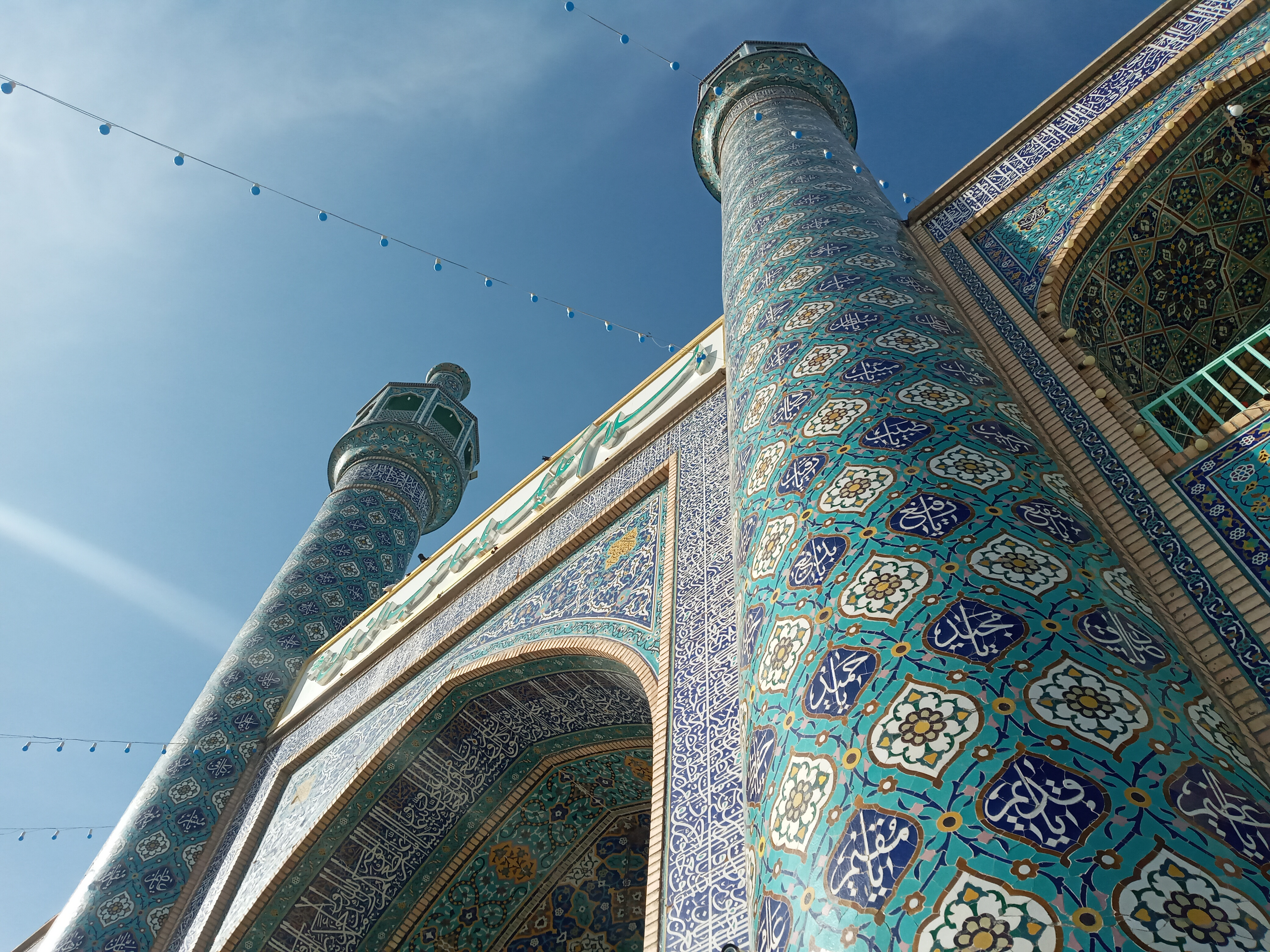
Imamzadeh Seyed Morteza minaret

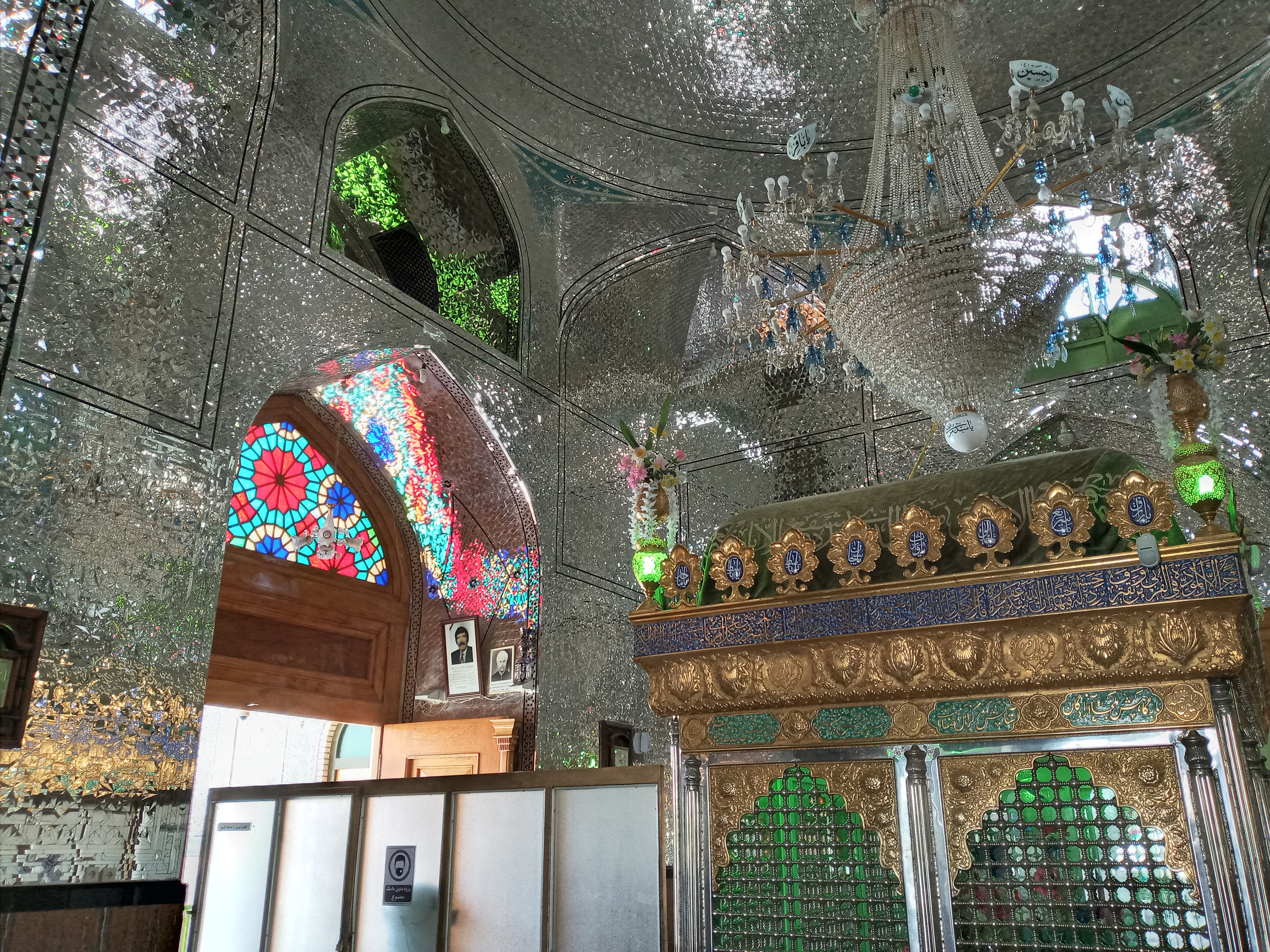
Inside of Imamzadeh Seyed Morteza

== See also ==
- Holiest sites in Shia Islam
  - Imam Ali Shrine
  - Imam Husayn Shrine
  - Imam Reza Shrine
  - Fatima Masumeh Shrine
  - Jamkaran Mosque
  - Al-Sahlah Mosque
  - Sayyidah Zaynab Mosque
  - Al-Abbas Shrine
  - Sayyidah Ruqayya Mosque
  - Al-Kadhimiya Mosque
  - Al-Askari Shrine
- Shia Islam in Iran
- List of imamzadehs in Iran
  - Imamzadeh Ja'far
  - Imamzadeh Ahmad
  - Imamzadeh Esmaeil and Isaiah mausoleum
  - Imamzadeh Haroun-e-Velayat
  - Imamzadeh Shah Zeyd
  - Imamzadeh Hamzeh
  - Imamzadeh Qasem
- List of mausoleums in Iran
  - Imamzadeh Chaharmanar
  - Imamzadeh Shahreza
  - Tomb of Shaykh Zahed Gilani
  - Sheikh Safi al-Din Khānegāh and Shrine Ensemble
  - Tomb of Shaykh Aminuddin Gabriel
  - Fakhrigah
  - Gur-e-Dokhtar
  - Tomb of Cyrus the Great
- List of mosques in Iran
  - Jameh Mosque of Germi
  - Jameh Mosque of Namin
  - Jameh Mosque of Arsanjan
  - Jameh Mosque of Darab
  - Jameh Mosque of Jahrom
  - Jameh Mosque of Kabir Neyriz
  - Jameh Mosque of Gorgan
