= Tomb of Hassan Modarres =

Mausoleum in Kashmar, Iranian national heritage site

- آرامگاه سید حسن مدرس
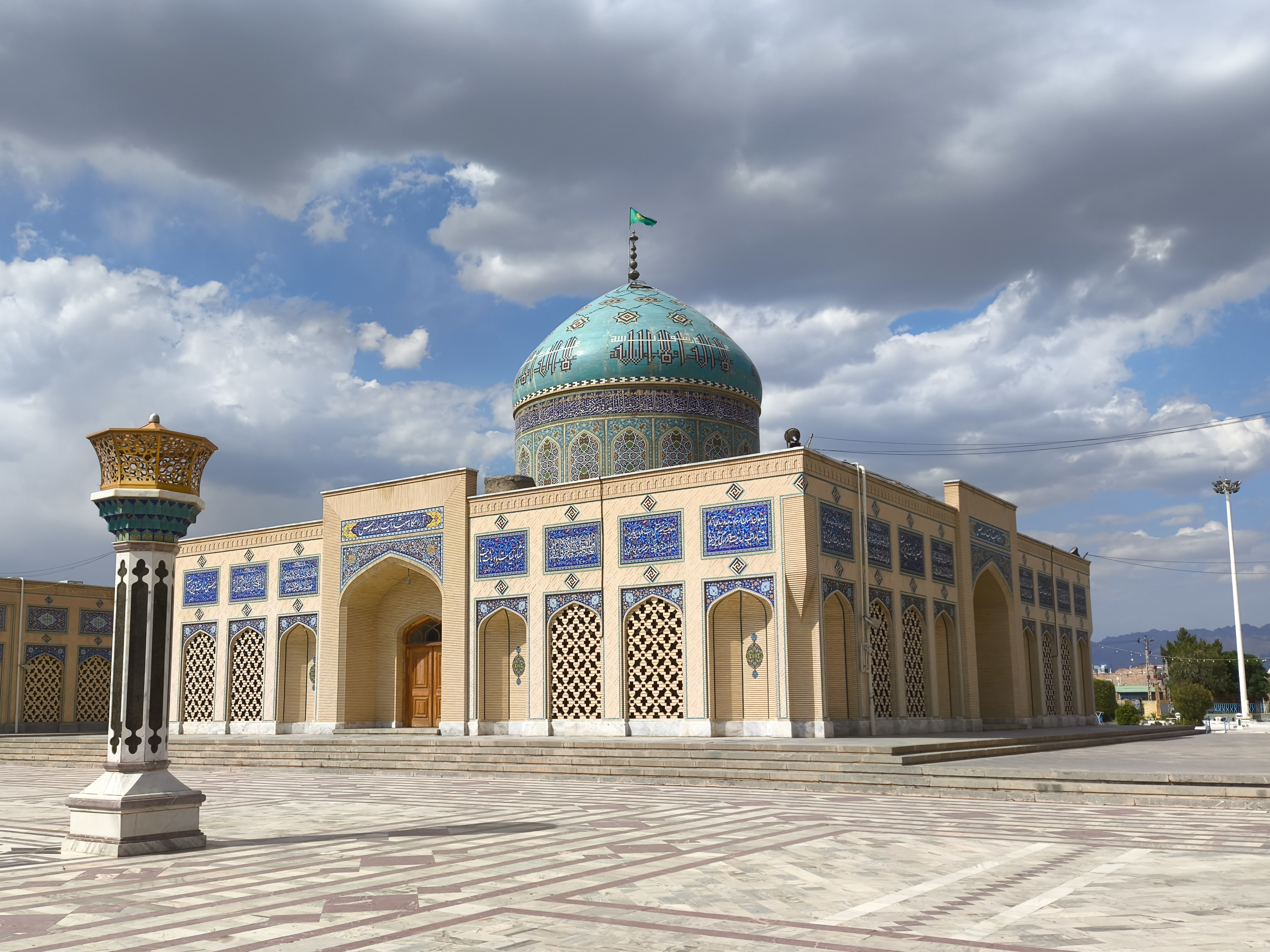
- The mausoleum in 2024

- Location of the tomb in Iran

Religion
- Affiliation: Islam
- Branch/tradition: Shia (Twelver)
- Ecclesiastical or organizational status: Mausoleum
- Status: Active

Location
- Location: Kashmar, Razavi Khorasan province
- Country: Iran
- Interactive map of Tomb of Hassan Modarres
- Coordinates: 35°13′52″N 58°27′13″E

Architecture
- Type: Islamic architecture
- Style: Pahlavi; Safavid (influences)
- Completed: 1943 CE (tomb); 26 March 1988 (renovation)

Specifications
- Dome: One
- Shrine: One: (Sayyid Hassan Modarres)
- Materials: Bricks; mortar

Website
- shahidmodarres.com

Iran National Heritage List
- Official name: Tomb of Hassan Modarres
- Type: Built
- Designated: 14 March 2005
- Reference no.: 11675
- Conservation organization: Cultural Heritage, Handicrafts and Tourism Organization of Iran

The Tomb of Hassan Modarres (Persian: آرامگاه سید حسن مدرس) (Note: Other names include the Mausoleum of Hassan Modarres, the Hassan Modarres Mausoleum, and the Hassan Modarres Tomb.) is a Twelver Shi'ite Islamic mausoleum, located in Kashmar, in the province of Razavi Khorasan, Iran. The mausoleum contains the remains of Sayyid Hassan Modarres, a prominent Shi'ite cleric who formerly served as a cabinet representative of the Islamic Consultative Assembly. He was assassinated in 1937, and the mausoleum was built over his grave in 1943 CE following the forced abdication of Reza Shah Pahlavi.

The mausoleum was added to the Iran National Heritage List on 14 March 2005, administered by the Cultural Heritage, Handicrafts and Tourism Organization of Iran.

== History ==
The mausoleum was built in 1943 CE, after Hassan Modarres' death in 1937, who was poisoned and then died of suffocation. After the exile of Reza Shah Pahlavi, a new tombstone for Hassan Modarres was erected over his grave by locals in an act of honour. A building was eventually built over the grave. Following the Iranian revolution, the new Supreme Leader of Iran, Ruhollah Khomeini, restored the mausoleum, and gave it an extensive rebuild.

== Architecture ==
The mausoleum was formerly a small building located in the middle of a large garden, which does not exist anymore after the expansion and reconstructions. The present mausoleum was built in the Safavid architectural style. It has four iwans, one on each side, and the mausoleum is topped by a large turquoise dome. Next to the mausoleum is the library of Hassan Modarres.

The grave of Hassan Modarres is located underneath the dome of the mausoleum.

== Gallery ==
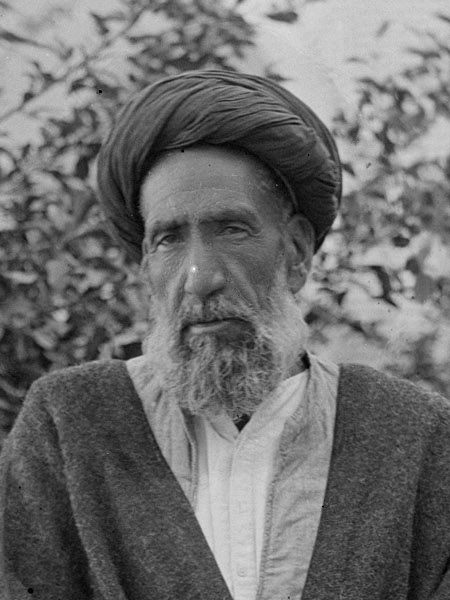
Portrait of Hassan Modarres taken by Antoin Sevruguin in the 1930s

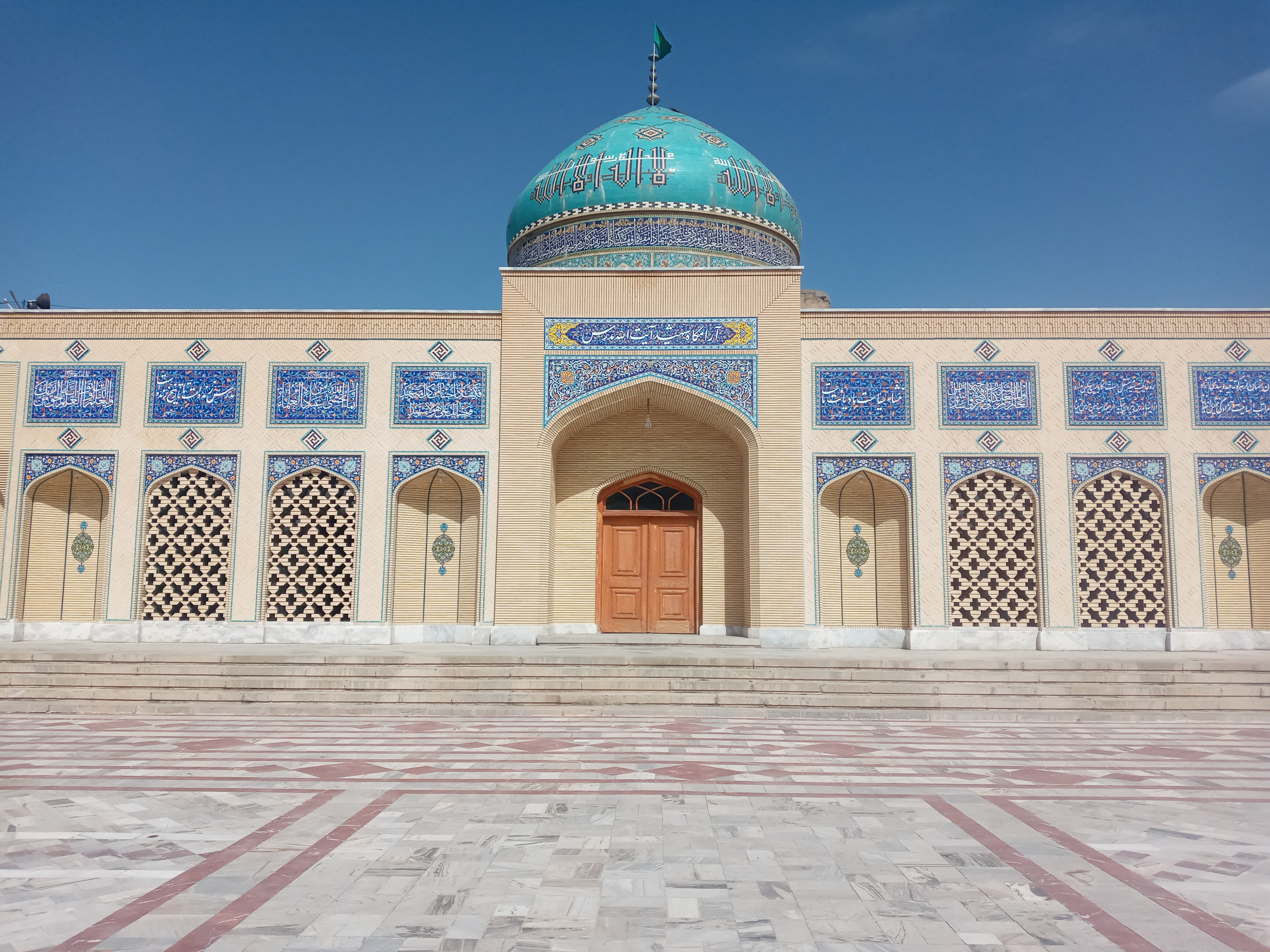
The main entrance to the mausoleum

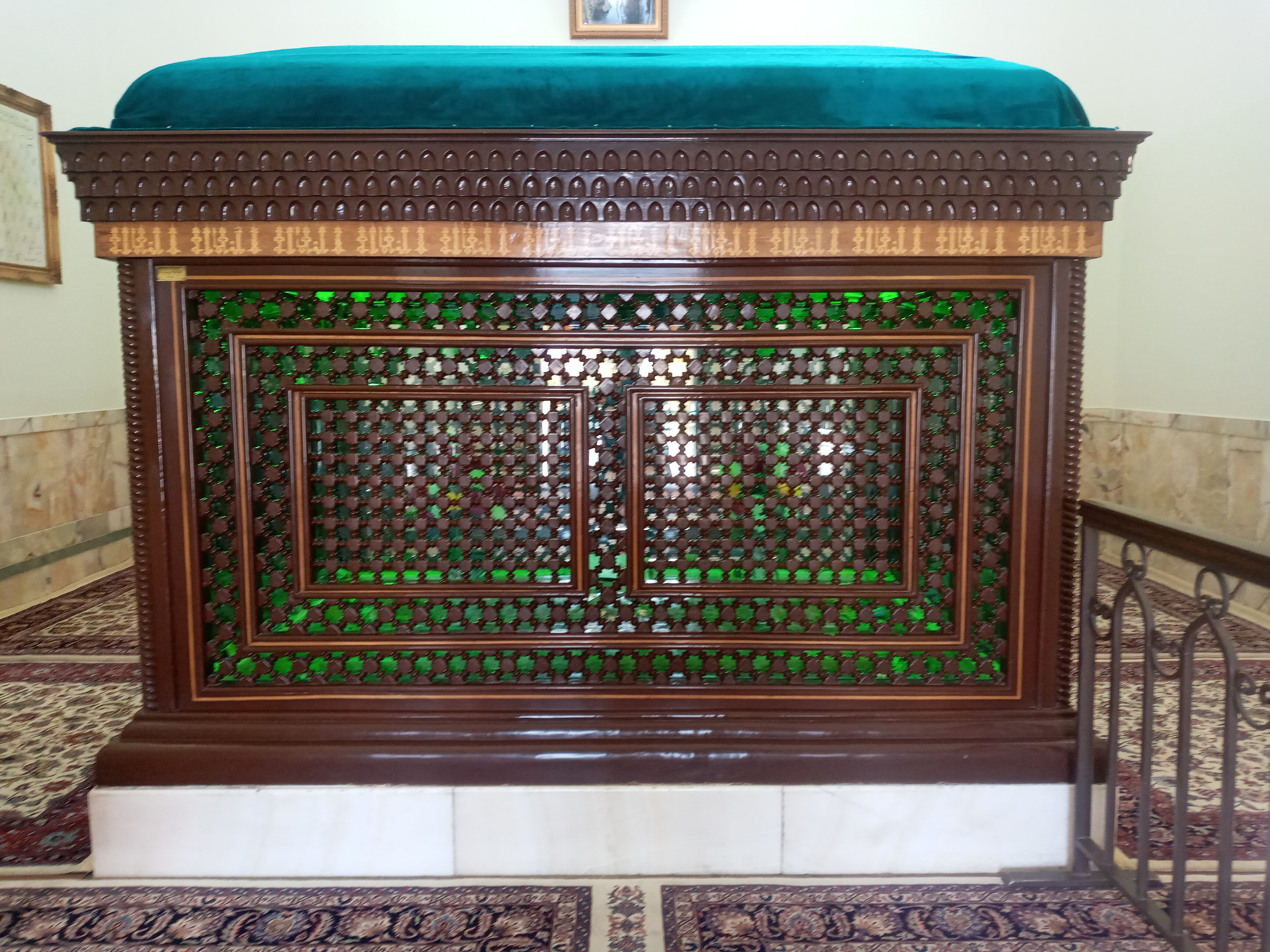
A wooden zarih encloses the grave underneath the dome

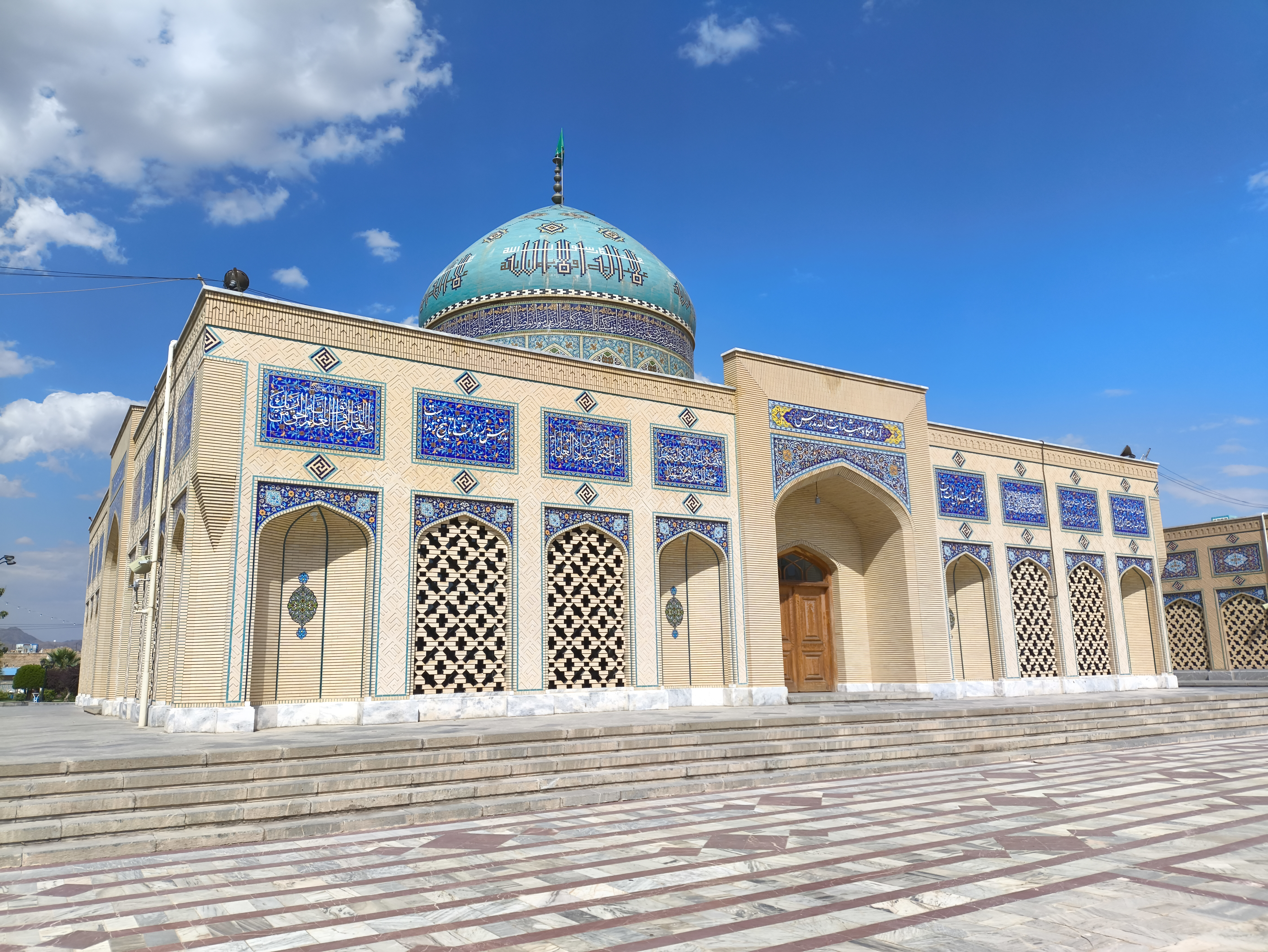
A larger view of the tomb of Hassan Modarres

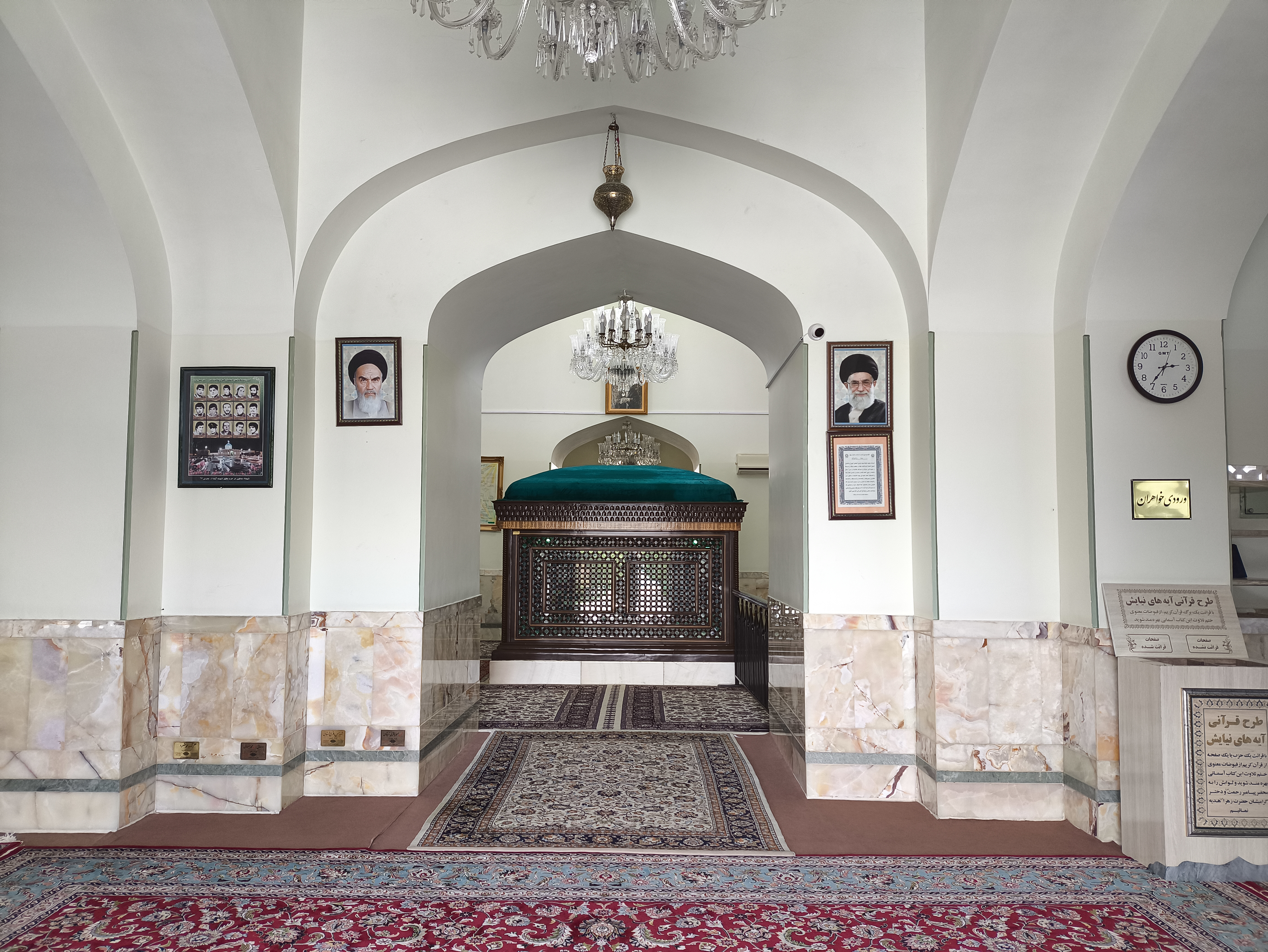
An inside view of the tomb of Hassan Modarres

== See also ==
- List of mausoleums in Iran
- Holiest sites in Shia Islam
  - Imam Ali Shrine
  - Imam Husayn Shrine
  - Imam Reza Shrine
  - Fatima Masumeh Shrine
  - Jamkaran Mosque
  - Al-Sahlah Mosque
  - Sayyidah Zaynab Mosque
  - Al-Abbas Shrine
  - Sayyidah Ruqayya Mosque
  - Al-Kadhimiya Mosque
  - Al-Askari Shrine
- Shia Islam in Iran
- List of imamzadehs in Iran
  - Imamzadeh Ja'far
  - Imamzadeh Ahmad
  - Imamzadeh Esmaeil and Isaiah mausoleum
  - Imamzadeh Haroun-e-Velayat
  - Imamzadeh Shah Zeyd
  - Imamzadeh Hamzeh
  - Imamzadeh Qasem
- List of mausoleums in Iran
  - Imamzadeh Chaharmanar
  - Imamzadeh Shahreza
  - Tomb of Shaykh Zahed Gilani
  - Sheikh Safi al-Din Khānegāh and Shrine Ensemble
  - Tomb of Shaykh Aminuddin Gabriel
  - Fakhrigah
  - Gur-e-Dokhtar
  - Tomb of Cyrus the Great
- List of mosques in Iran
  - Jameh Mosque of Germi
  - Jameh Mosque of Namin
  - Jameh Mosque of Arsanjan
  - Jameh Mosque of Darab
  - Jameh Mosque of Jahrom
  - Jameh Mosque of Kabir Neyriz
  - Jameh Mosque of Gorgan
