= Hassan Modarres =

Iranian Twelver Shi'a cleric and supporter of the Iranian Constitutional Revolution

Seyyed Hassan Modarres
- حسن مدرس
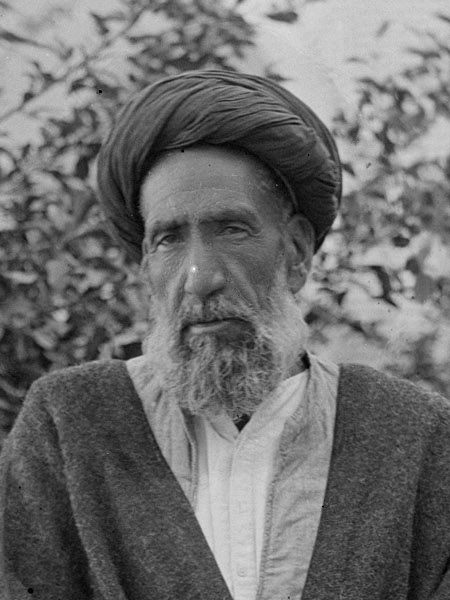
- Photograph by Antoin Sevruguin, c. 1930s

Member of the Parliament
- In office 11 July 1926 – 13 August 1928
- Monarch: Reza Shah
- Constituency: Tehran
- In office 11 February 1924 – 11 February 1926
- Monarchs: Reza Shah; Ahmad Shah Qajar
- Constituency: Tehran
- Majority: Ranked 1st
- In office 22 June 1921 – 11 June 1923
- Monarch: Ahmad Shah Qajar
- Constituency: Tehran
- In office 6 December 1914 – 13 November 1915
- Monarch: Ahmad Shah Qajar
- Constituency: Tehran

Personal details
- Born: Seyyed Hassan Tabatabaei Ardestani سید حسن طباطبایی اردستانی c. 1870 Sarabeh, Ardestan, Sublime State of Persia
- Died: 1 December 1937 (aged 67) Kashmar, Khurasan, Imperial State of Iran
- Resting place: Tomb of Hassan Modarres, Kashmar, Iran
- Party: Reformers' Party (1921–1926); Learned Council (1914–1915); Moderates Party (Pre 1914)
- Education: Najaf Seminary
- Occupation: Teacher

Hassan Modarres (Persian: سید حسن مدرس; c. 1870, Sarabeh – 1 December 1937, Kashmar) was an Iranian Twelver Shi'a cleric and a notable supporter of the Iranian Constitutional Revolution. He was among the founding members, along with Abdolhossein Teymourtash, of the reformist party Hezb-e Eslaah-talab, which was formed during the fourth national Majlis of Iran. He has been called "brave and incorruptible" and "perhaps the most fervent cleric supporter of true constitutional government".

== Biography ==
The sources disagree on his birthplace. Some mention that he was born in Ardestan around 1870, while others mention that he was born in a village named Sarābe-Kachou (Persian: سرابه‌کچو) near Ardestan in the early 1870s, and that he moved to Shahreza when he was six.

=== Activities ===
Having studied Islamic sciences in Isfahan and Najaf, Modarres became a religious teacher in an Isfahan's madrasa. The name Modarres, which means "teacher", is because of his job there. In 1910, he was chosen by Najaf's cleric community and sent to Tehran to supervise the laws passed by the Majlis, to make sure they did not violate the rules of sharia. Later, in 1914, he was elected as a Majlis representative of Tehran.

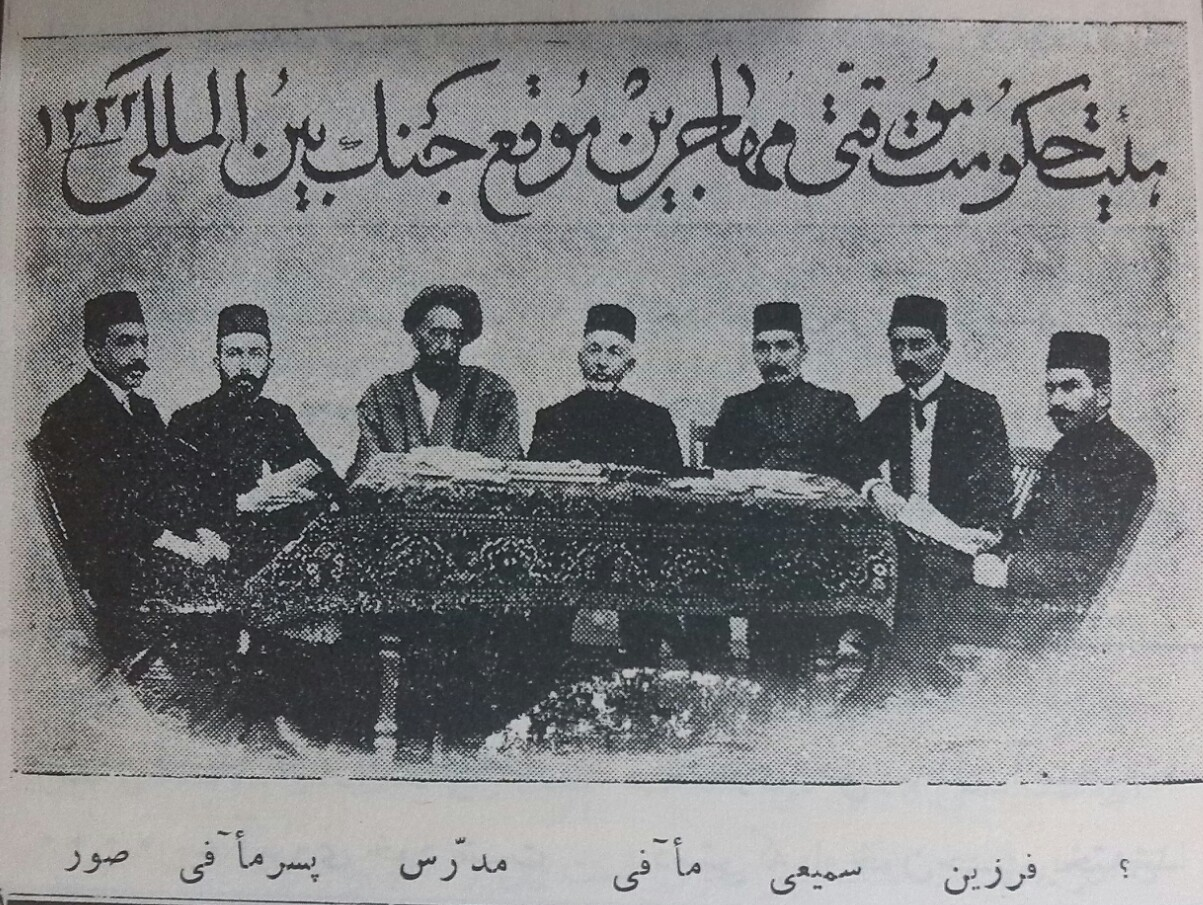
Modarres, third from left, in the cabinet in exile during World War I

In 1916, during World War I, he migrated to Iraq, Syria, and Turkey together with a handful of other politicians, and served as the Minister of Justice in a cabinet formed in exile by Nezam os-Saltaneh. After returning to Iran, he was elected in the Majlis elections a few more times. Modarres fought against the presence of British forces in Persia, vigorously opposing the proposed 1919 agreement that would have transformed Iran into a British protectorate.

In the early 1920s, he played a role in preventing Reza Khan (the prime minister at the time) from abolishing the monarchy (the Qajar dynasty) and declaring a republic, and less successfully opposed Reza Khan's deposing of the Qajar dynasty in 1925. Sayyed Modaress was openly critical of Reza Shah's rule and was placed under imprisonment in retaliation for his criticisms. A few years after a November 1926 assassination attempt against him, Modarres was expelled to Khaf and later to Kashmar.

Ruhollah Khomeini, who later became the Supreme Leader of Iran after the Iranian Revolution, was affected by him.

== Death ==
He was killed in prison in December 1937. His death is regarded as martyrdom and the martyrdom day (10th of Azar) is known in Iran as Majlis day (day of the parliament). According to Tasnim he was poisoned in prison and then suffocated while praying.

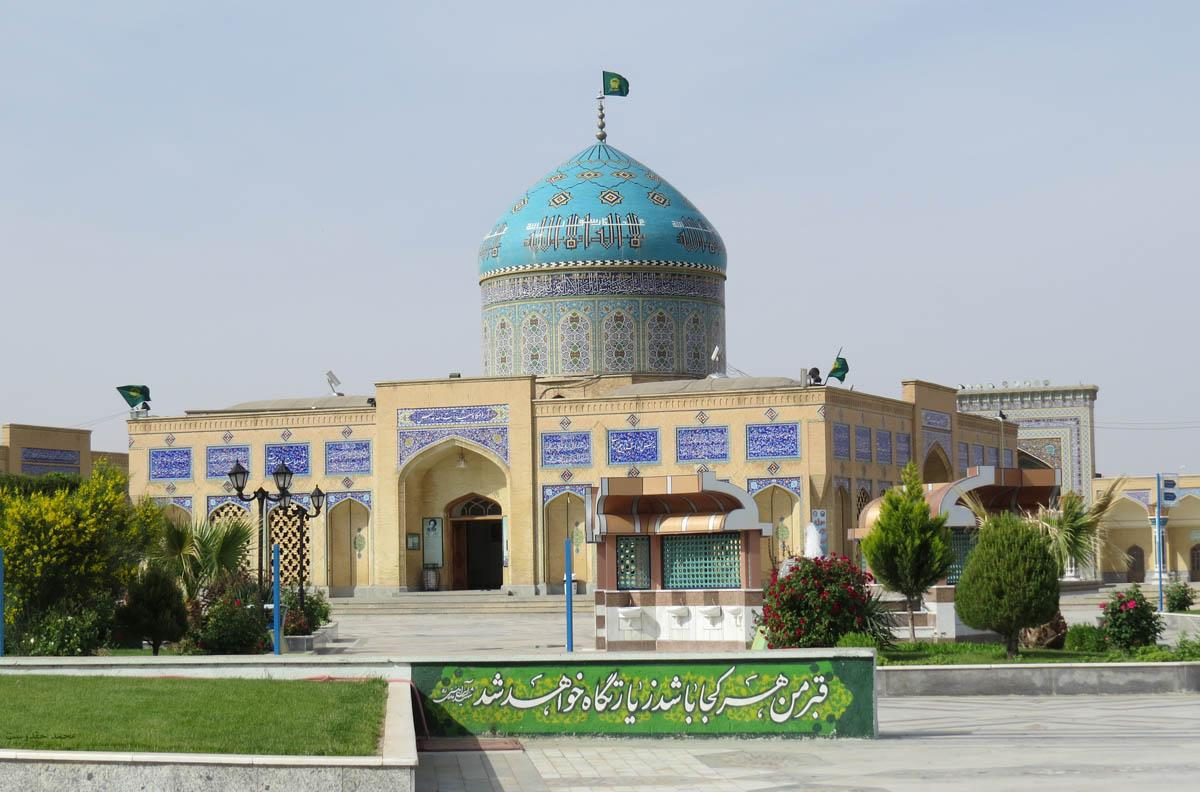
The Tomb of Hassan Modarres

=== Tomb of Hassan Modarres ===
The Tomb of Sayyid Hassan Modarres is the burial site of Seyyid Hassan Modarres, former prime minister of Iran. It was built in 1937 in Kashmar, Iran, as opposed to using the former tomb of Kashmar in the vast gardens of Kashmar. The tomb building consists of a central dome, four dock and a dome made of turquoise, in the style of Islamic architecture and Safavid architecture.

== Hassan Modarres Museum ==
The Hassan Modarres Museum is a Museum belongs to the 21st century and is located in Kashmar, Razavi Khorasan province, Iran.

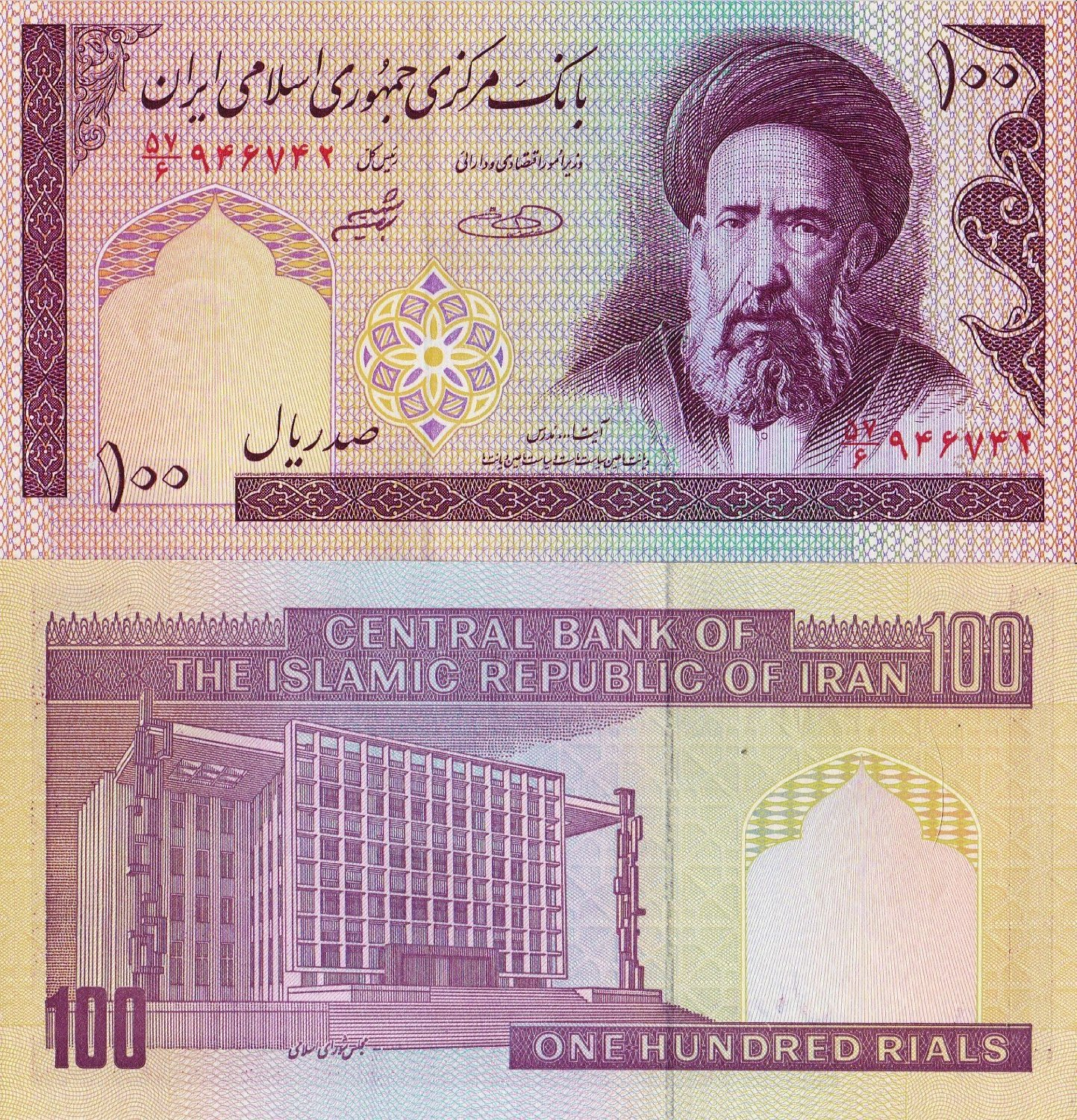
On 100 rials banknote

== Reception ==
Modarres is depicted on the obverse of the Iranian 100 rials banknote.

== See also ==
- Tomb of Hassan Modarres
- Abol-Ghasem Kashani
- Mohammad Mosaddegh

== Sources ==
- The Persian Encyclopedia's entry on Modarres.
- Mohammad Taghi Bahar, Taarikh-e Mokhtasar-e Ahzaab-e Siaasi-e Iraan (A Short History of Political Parties of Iran), Amirkabir, 1978.
- Yadegari, Amir Hossein (November 2005). "Siāsatmadār-e Dindār", Hamshahri-e Māh, ("Religious Politician", Our Fellow Citizen) Ābān 1384 A.P., page 4.
- Abrahamian, Ervand (1982). Iran Between Two Revolutions. Princeton University Press. ISBN 0-691-05342-1.
- Mottahedeh, Roy (2000) [1985]. The Mantle of the Prophet : Religion and Politics in Iran. Oxford: One World. ISBN 1-85168-234-1.
