= Kalkhuran Sheykh =

Neighborhood in Ardabil province, Iran

Kalkhuran Sheykh Persian: كلخوران شيخ
- Neighborhood
- Location within Iran
- Coordinates: 38°17′24″N 48°17′35″E
- Country: Iran
- Province: Ardabil
- County: Ardabil
- District: Central
- City: Ardabil

Population (2006)
  - Total: 3,069
- Time zone: UTC+3:30 (IRST)

Kalkhuran Sheykh (Persian: كلخوران شيخ) (Note: Also romanized as Kalkhowrān Sheykh and Kalkhūrān Sheykh; also known as Kalkharān Sheykh, Kalkhowrān ‘Olyā, Kalkhūrān, and Sheykh Kalkharān) is a neighborhood in the city of Ardabil in the Central District of Ardabil County, Ardabil province, Iran.

== Demographics ==
=== Population ===
At the time of the 2006 National Census, Kalkhuran Sheykh's population was 3,069 in 794 households, when it was a village in, and the capital of, Kalkhuran Rural District. After the census, the village was annexed by the city of Ardabil.
