= Tomb of Shaykh Aminuddin Gabriel =

Tomb of Shaykh Aminuddin Jibrail
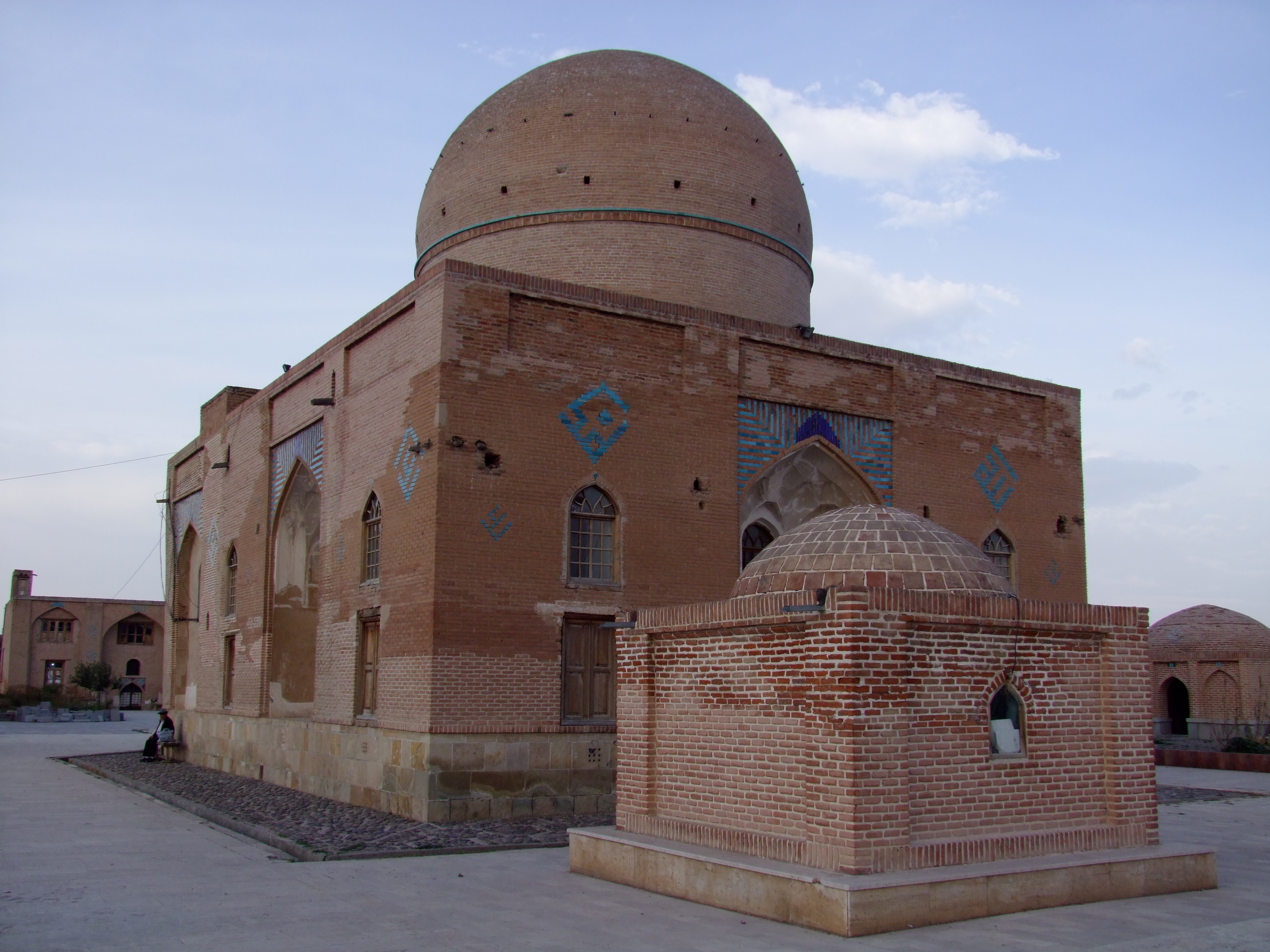

- Location of the tomb in Iran

Religion
- Affiliation: Islam
- Ecclesiastical or organisational status: Mausoleum

Location
- Location: Kalkhuran Sheykh, Ardabil, Ardabil Province
- Country: Iran
- Coordinates: 38°17′17″N 48°17′43″E

Architecture
- Type: Islamic architecture
- Style: Safavid architecture
- Completed: 1622 CE

Specifications
- Length: 24 m (79 ft)
- Width: 8.14 m (26.7 ft)
- Materials: Bricks
- Iran National Heritage List
- Official name: Mausoleum of Sheikh Jebrail
- Type: Mausoleum
- Designated: 1932
- Reference no.: 65
- Conservation organization: Cultural Heritage, Handicrafts and Tourism Organization of Iran

The Tomb of Shaykh Aminuddin Jibrail (Persian: آرامگاه سید امین‌الدین جبراییل) is a 17th-century Safavid era mausoleum located in the village of Kalkhuran Sheykh in Ardabil, Iran.

It is built over the grave of Amin al-Din Jibrail, the father of the famous mystic Safi-ad-din Ardabili, and was first constructed in 1622 CE. The tomb was added to the Iran National Heritage List, number 65.

== Architecture ==
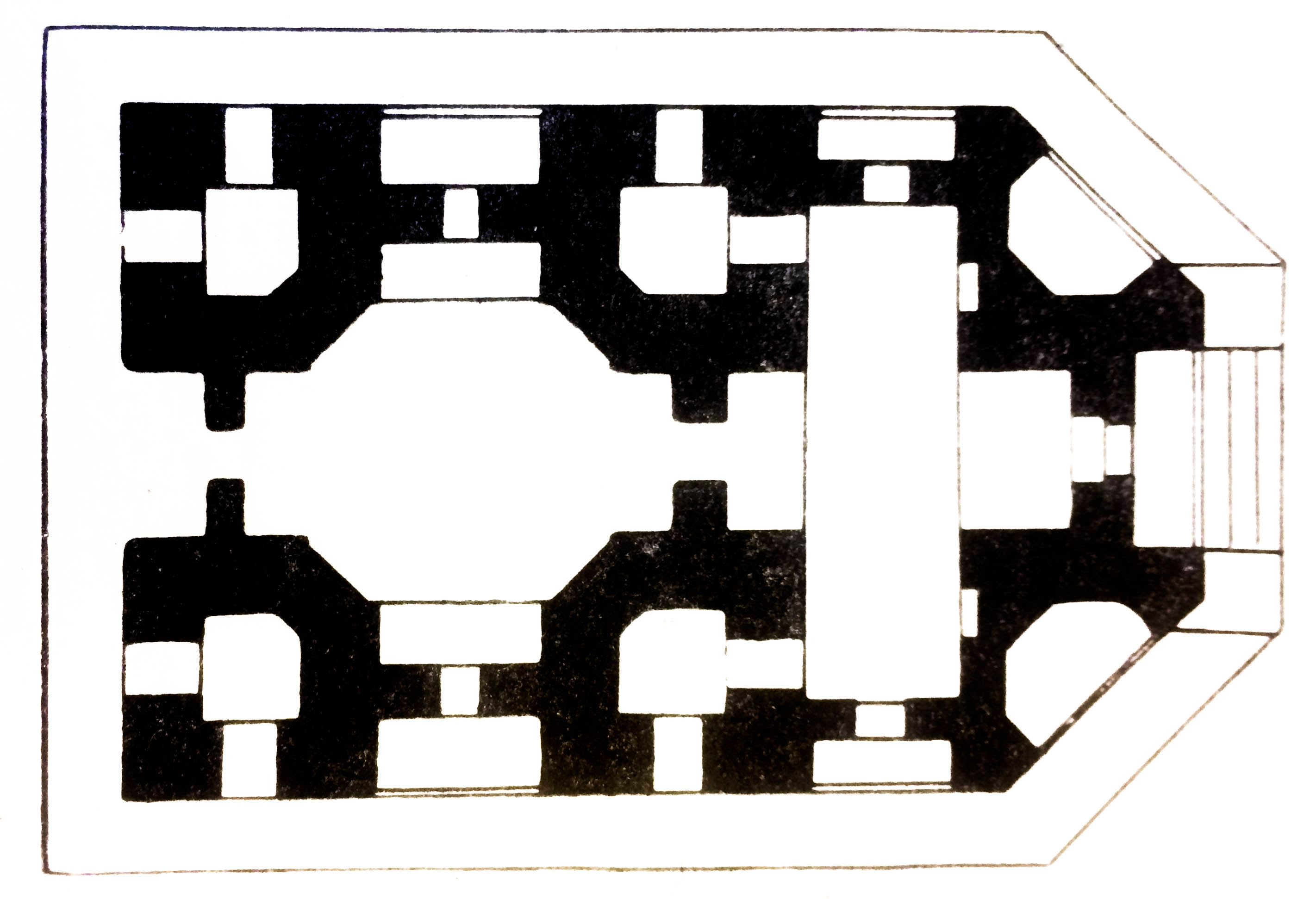
Architectural plan of the mausoleum

The mausoleum is built from brick, and is octagonal in shape. It is situated in the center of a garden, with an area of approximately 30,000 square metres. The area of the building is approximately 196 square metres, from its northern to southern facade.

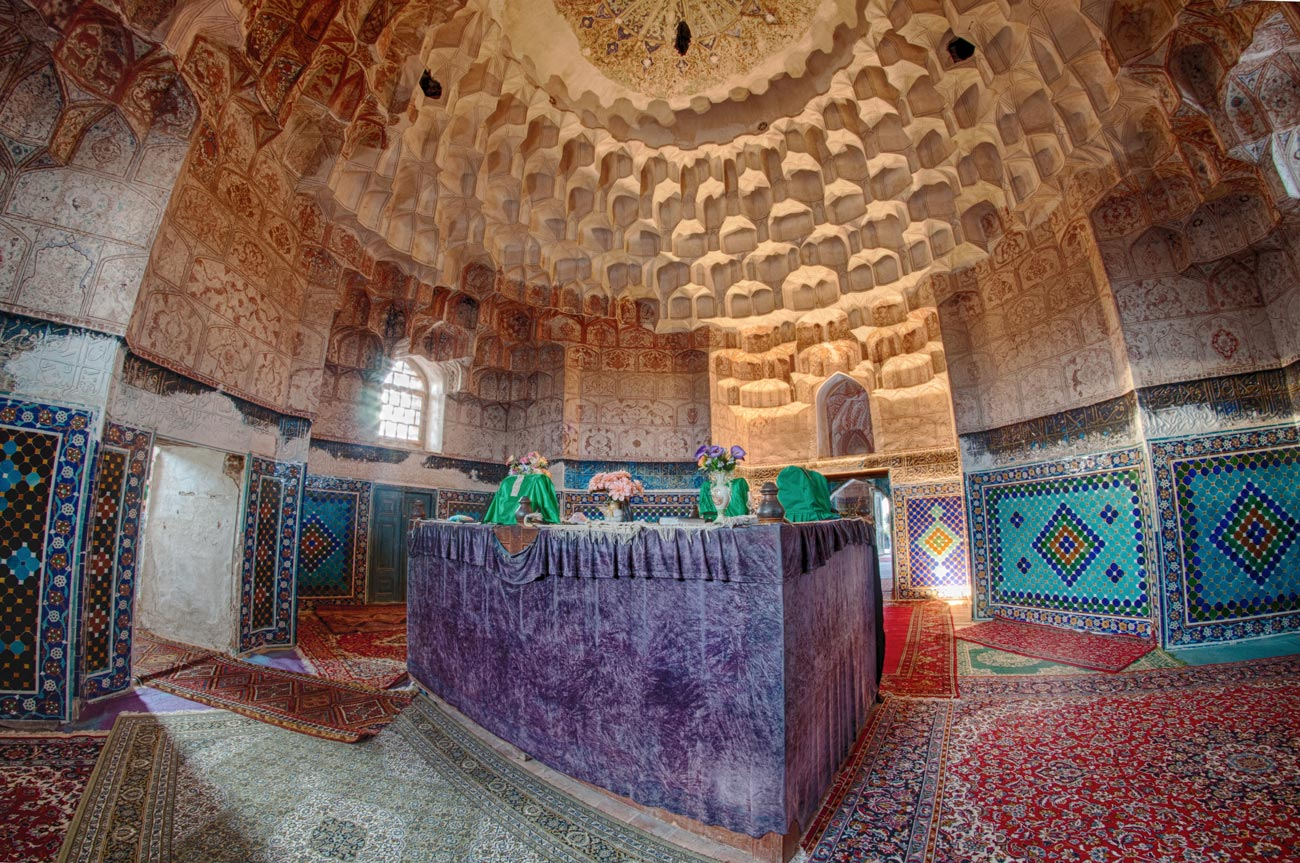
View of the tomb's interior, Amin al-Din Jibrail's grave underneath muqarnas plasterwork

Inside the mausoleum, there is elaborate muqarnas plasterwork done on the ceiling and dome.

== See also ==
- List of mausoleums in Iran
