= Sarabeh =

Village in Isfahan province, Iran

Sarabeh Persian: سرابه
- Village
- Location within Iran
- Coordinates: 33°17′39″N 52°27′15″E
- Country: Iran
- Province: Isfahan
- County: Ardestan
- District: Central
- Rural District: Kachu

Population (2016)
  - Total: 109
- Time zone: UTC+3:30 (IRST)

Sarabeh (Persian: سرابه) (Note: Also romanized as Sarābeh) is a village in Kachu Rural District of the Central District in Ardestan County, Isfahan province, Iran.

== Demographics ==
=== Population ===
At the time of the 2006 National Census, the village's population was 28 in 17 households. The following census in 2011 counted 17 people in 12 households. The 2016 census measured the population of the village as 109 people in 41 households.
