= Imamzadeh Qasem, Khalilabad =

Coordinates: 35.2275°N 58.2248°E

Imamzadeh Qasem
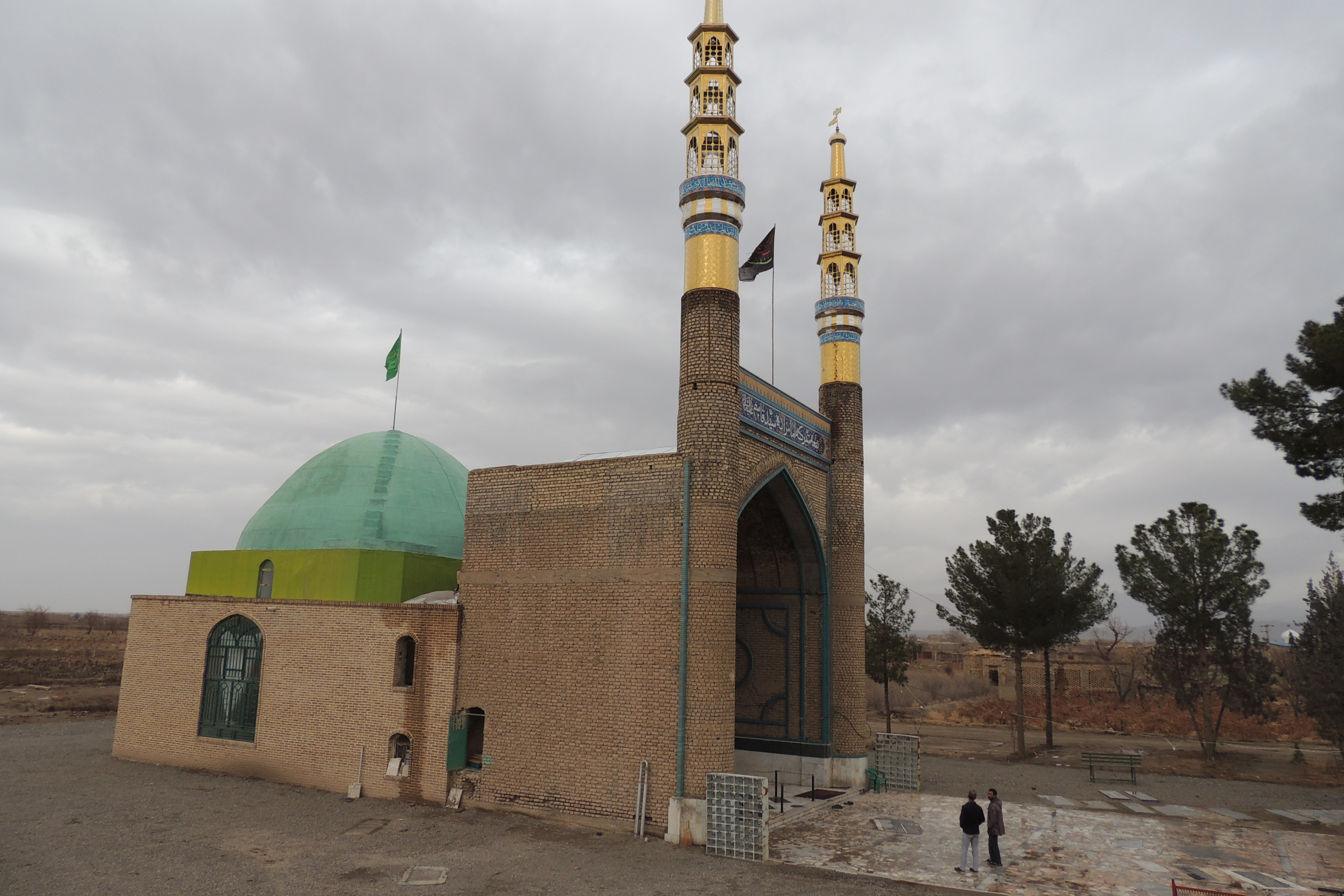

- Location within Iran

Religion
- Affiliation: Shia Islam

Location
- Location: Khalilabad County, Iran
- Interactive map of Imamzadeh Qasem

Architecture
- Style: Islamic architecture

Imamzadeh Qasem (Persian: امامزاده قاسم) is a Imamzadeh in Khalilabad County, Razavi Khorasan Province in Iran.
