= Fakhrigah =

Rock tomb in West Azerbaijan, Iran

Fakhrigah Rock Tomb گوردخمه فخریگاه

- Location within Iran
- 36°51′16.8″N 45°46′28″E
- Location: Egriqash, Mahabad, West Azerbaijan, Iran

Iran National Heritage List
- Official name: Fakhrigah Rock Tomb
- Type: Rock Tomb
- Designated: 1937
- Reference no.: 213
- Conservation organization: Cultural Heritage, Handicrafts and Tourism Organization of Iran

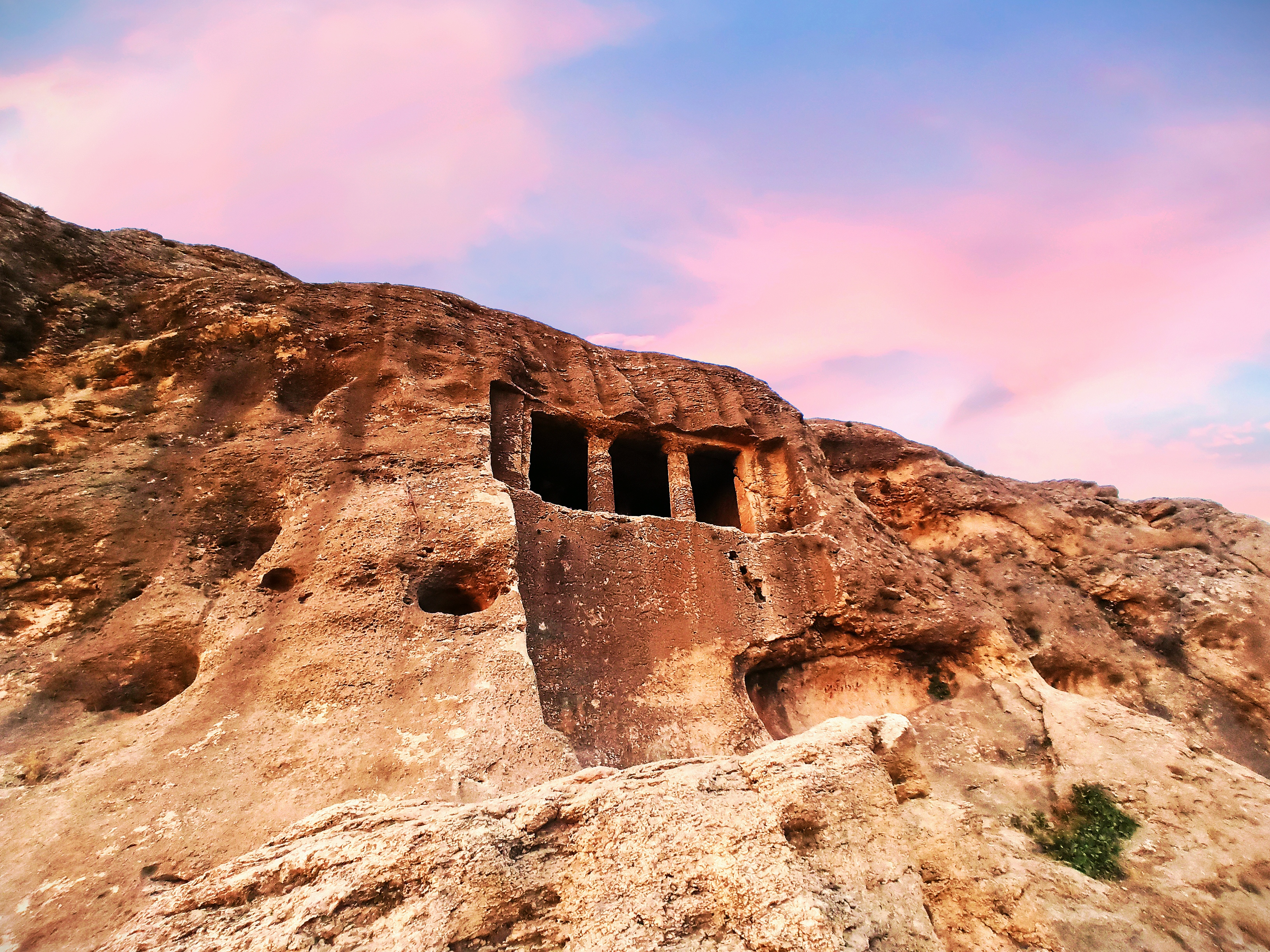
Faghragha in sunset

The rock tomb of Fakhrigah (or Faghragha) (Persian: فقرگاه; Kurdish: فەقرەقا,) lies 15 km to the northeast of Mahabad, West Azerbaijan province, Iran. It is located along the Mahabad−Miandoab Road south of the village of Inderghash in Iranian Kurdistan.

== Archaeological history ==
In 1936, Aurel Stein, a British archaeologist and explorer, wrote about the tomb and defensive constructions further along, and Wolfram Kleiss prepared sketches of the tombs. In 1896, Jacques de Morgan made an overall plan, including the precise detail of the tomb's interior and columns, with a copy of the inscriptions already mentioned by Rawlinson, which he subsequently published.

C. F. Leman, an explorer whose main purpose during his travels was to carry out research on the Armenian people, measured the tomb with precision. Hertzfeld, relying on these sketches, prepared plans and sketches which were also reliable and were used as a basis in all subsequent rock studies.

== Description ==
The tomb structure includes a porch, behind which is a room containing the graves. The tomb is the only one of all the rock tombs identified in Iran with a facade, and an interior which has columns and lacks any walls. The facade of the tomb has been built on a completely smooth rock wall, with an average height of 4.70 meters and is of the same width as the facade.

The columned porch is surrounded by an engraved frame, the band of which is 22 cm wide, and which ends on two sides with the two stepped platforms of the front porch. This frames the entrance and is shaped on either side in pillars, and above and below is shaped as a flat portal and a threshold respectively. The two facade columns of the tomb which form the appearance of the tomb in width and depth axis are almost of the same shape. The capitals appear to be composed of simple square or rectangular shapes. The conic pedestals of the two front columns are of the same level as the threshold of the front porch, but are on a different floor level from the main porch.

Behind the front row of columns, there is a porch which is almost rectangular in shape. This has a width of 6.25 meters in the center and a depth of 2.82 meters.
