= Jameh Mosque of Jahrom =

Mosque in Jahrom, Fars, Iran

- مسجد جامع جهرم
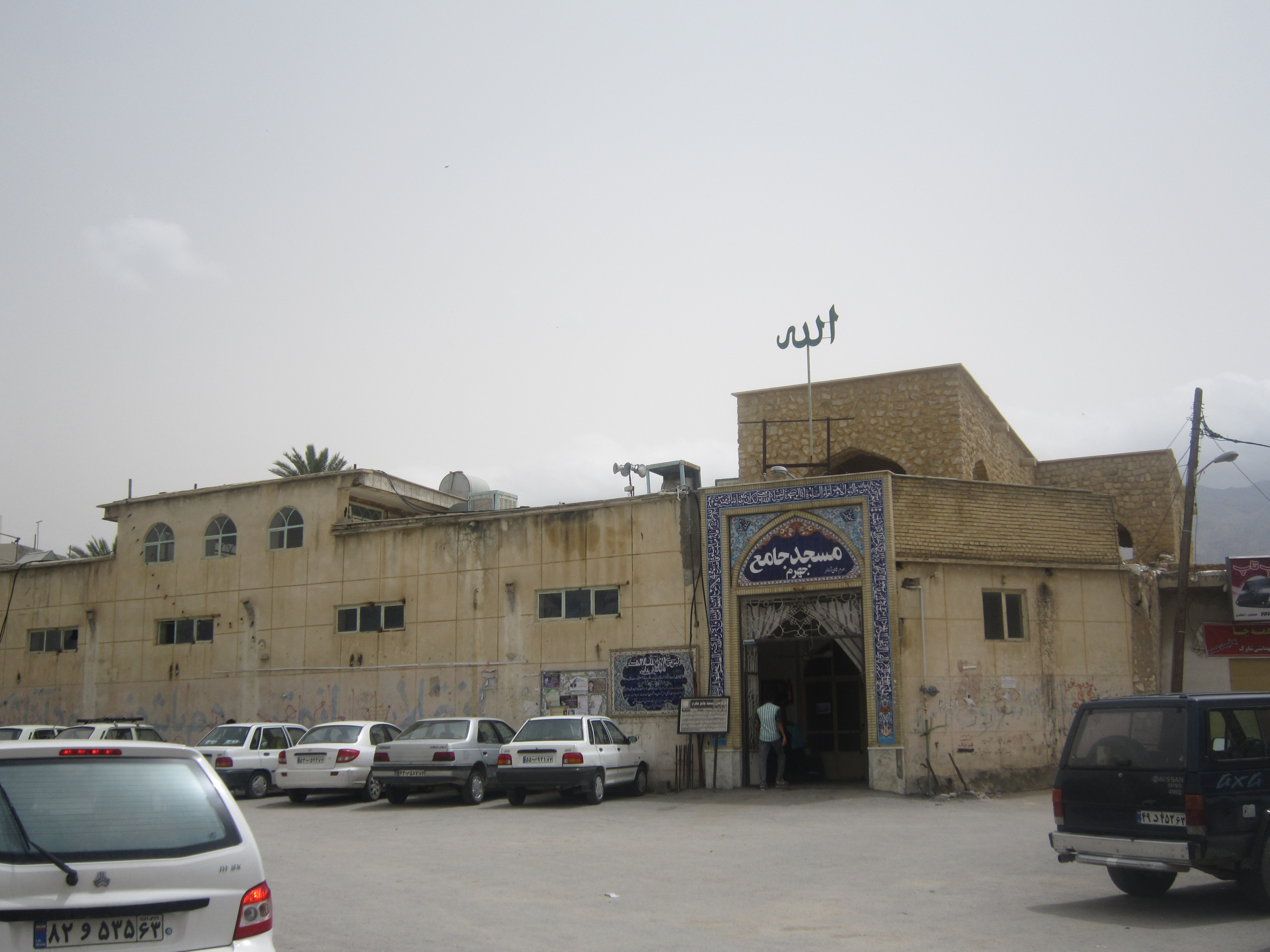
- Entrance to the mosque, in 2012

- Location of the mosque in Iran

Religion
- Affiliation: Shia Islam
- Ecclesiastical or organizational status: Friday mosque
- Status: Active

Location
- Location: 22 Bahman Ave, Jahrom, Fars
- Country: Iran
- Interactive map of Jameh Mosque of Jahrom
- Coordinates: 28°30′12″N 53°33′10″E

Architecture
- Type: Mosque architecture
- Style: Seljuk; Safavid; Qajar
- Completed: Seljuk era; 1673 CE (renovations)

Specifications
- Interior area: 1,000 m^{2} (11,000 sq ft)
- Dome: One (maybe more)
- Materials: Stone; plaster; bricks; tiles

Iran National Heritage List
- Official name: Jahrom Friday Mosque
- Type: Built
- Designated: 1974
- Reference no.: 987
- Conservation organization: Cultural Heritage, Handicrafts and Tourism Organization of Iran

The Jameh Mosque of Jahrom (Persian: مسجد جامع جهرم) is a Shi'ite Friday mosque, located adjacent to the Jahrom Bazaar, in the old Sinan neighborhood of Jahrom, in the province of Fars, Iran. The mosque was built during the Seljuq era in the 11th-12th centuries, and completed in 1673 CE.

The mosque was added to the Iran National Heritage List in 1974, administered by the Cultural Heritage, Handicrafts and Tourism Organization of Iran.

== See also ==
- Shia Islam in Iran
- List of mosques in Iran
