= Jameh Mosque of Namin =

Mosque in Namin, Ardabil, Iran

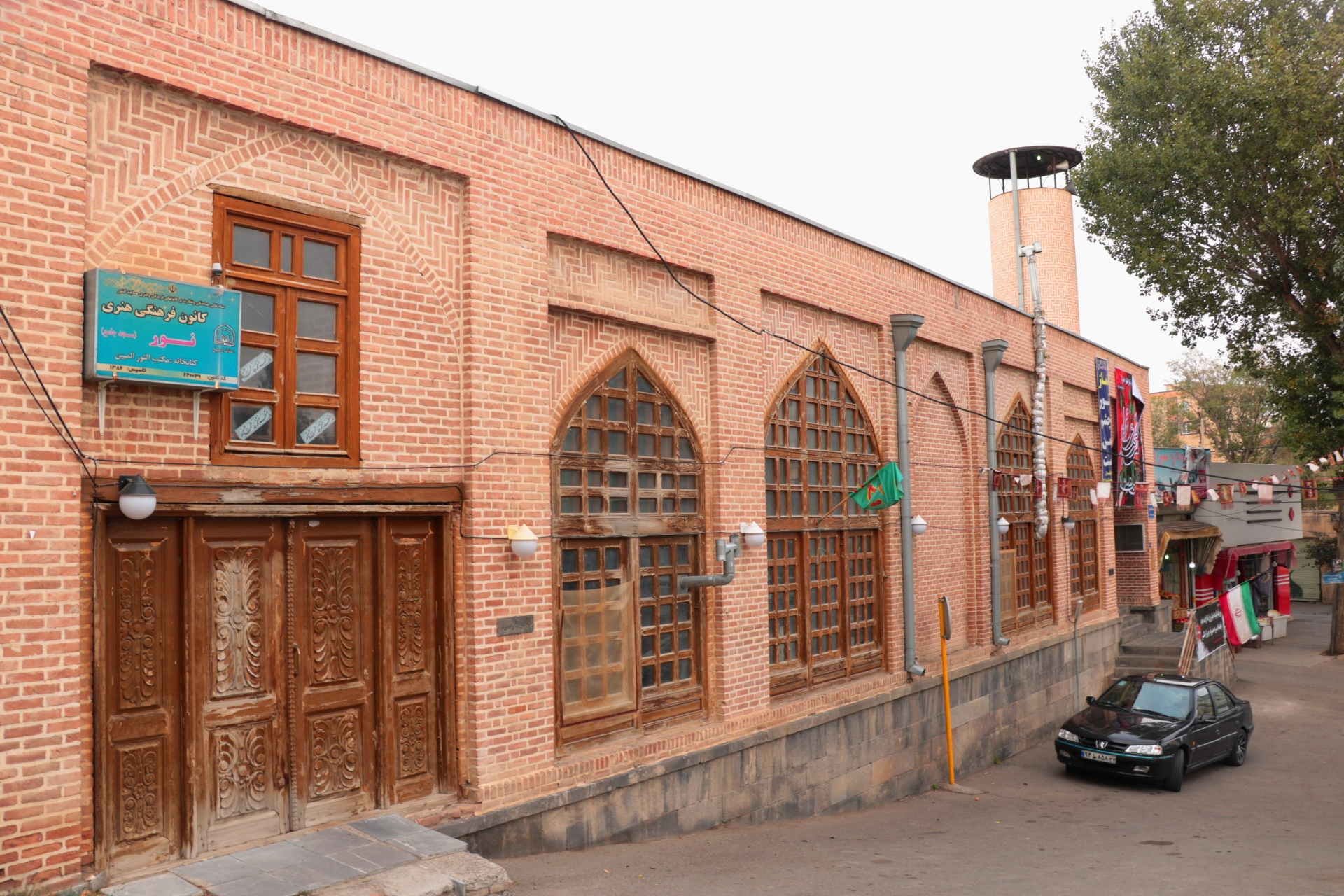

- Location of the mosque in Iran

Religion
- Affiliation: Shia Islam
- Ecclesiastical or organizational status: Friday mosque and hammam
- Status: Active

Location
- Location: Imam Khomeini Street, Namin, Ardabil Province
- Country: Iran
- Interactive map of Jameh Mosque of Namin

Architecture
- Type: Mosque architecture
- Style: Qajar
- Founder: Farkhondeh Khanoom
- Completed: Qajar era

Specifications
- Minaret: One
- Materials: Brick

Iran National Heritage List
- Official name: Jameh Mosque of Namin
- Type: Archaeological
- Designated: 31 December 2002
- Reference no.: 6690
- Conservation organization: Cultural Heritage, Handicrafts and Tourism Organization of Iran

The Jameh Mosque of Namin (Persian: مسجد جامع نمین; Arabic: جامع نمين) is a Shi'ite Friday mosque, located in Namin, in the province of Ardabil, Iran. The mosque was built during the Qajar era, by the order of Farkhondeh Khanoom, a benevolent lady. It is situated on Imam Khomeini Street, near the bazaar. The mosque facilities include a hammam.

The mosque was added to the Iran National Heritage List on 31 December 2002, administered by the Cultural Heritage, Handicrafts and Tourism Organization of Iran.

== See also ==
- Shia Islam in Iran
- List of mosques in Iran
