= Imamzadeh Ja'far =

Imamzadeh Ja'far or Emamzadeh Ja'far (Persian: امامزاده جعفر) may refer to:

- Emamzadeh Jafar, Kohgiluyeh and Boyer-Ahmad, a village in Iran
- Emamzadeh Jafar Rural District, in Kohgiluyeh and Boyer-Ahmad Province, Iran
- Imamzadeh Ja'far, Borujerd, a tomb in Iran
- Imamzadeh Ja'far, Damghan, a tomb in Iran
- Imamzadeh Ja'far, Isfahan, a tomb in Iran
- Pishva, a city in Iran
