= Jameh Mosque of Darab =

Mosque in Darab, Fars, Iran

Jāmeh Mosque of Darab
- مسجد جامع داراب
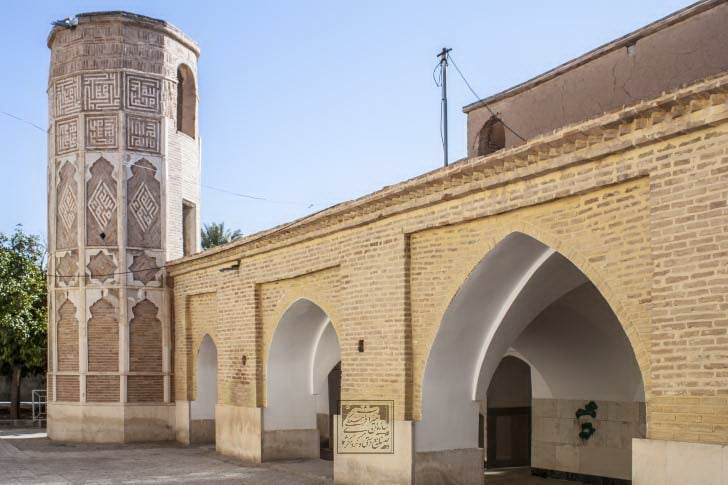
- The mosque with one minaret, in 2024

- Location of the mosque in Iran

Religion
- Affiliation: Shia Islam
- Ecclesiastical or organizational status: Friday mosque
- Status: Active

Location
- Location: Darab, Fars
- Country: Iran
- Interactive map of Jāmeh Mosque of Darab
- Coordinates: 28°44′52″N 54°32′32″E

Architecture
- Type: Mosque architecture
- Style: Seljuk
- Completed: Seljuq era

Specifications
- Dome: One (maybe more)
- Minaret: Four
- Materials: Bricks

Iran National Heritage List
- Official name: Friday Mosque of Darab
- Type: Built
- Designated: 9 January 1978
- Reference no.: 1597
- Conservation organization: Cultural Heritage, Handicrafts and Tourism Organization of Iran

The Jāmeh Mosque of Darab (Persian: مسجد جامع داراب; Arabic: جامع داراب) is a Shi'ite Friday mosque (jāmeh), located in the city of Darab, in the province of Fars, Iran. Built during the Seljuq era, it is the only mosque in Iran with four minarets.

The mosque was added to the Iran National Heritage List on 9 January 1978, administered by the Cultural Heritage, Handicrafts and Tourism Organization of Iran.

== See also ==
- Shia Islam in Iran
- List of mosques in Iran
