= Jameh Mosque of Gorgan =

Mosque in Gorgan, Golestan, Iran

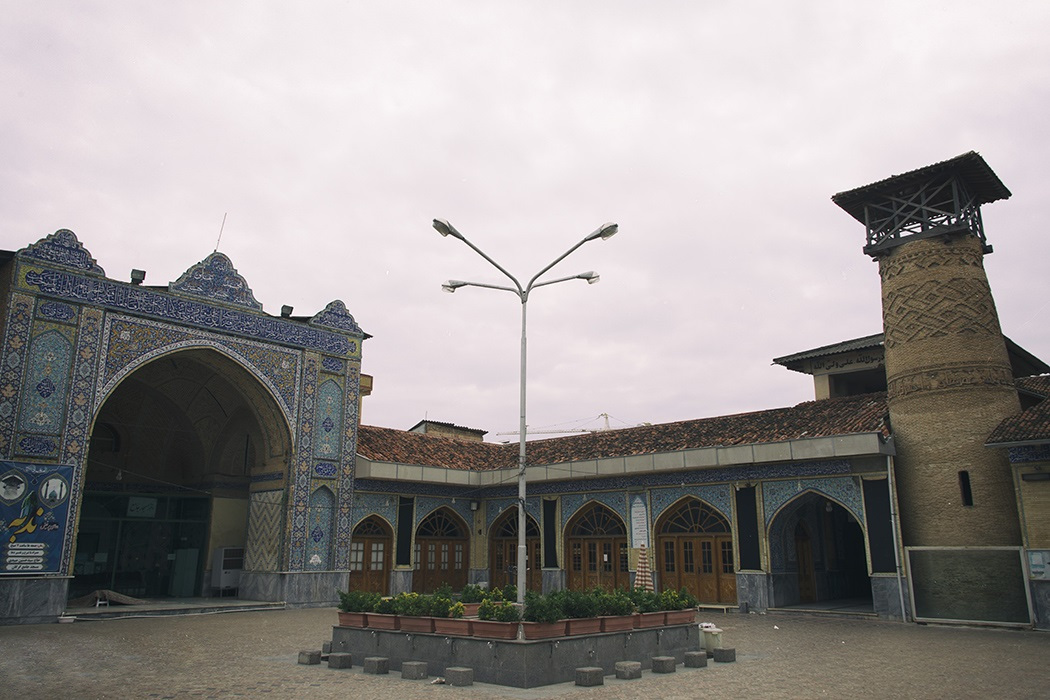
- The mosque, viewed from the sahn, with minaret, in 2018

- Location of the mosque in Iran

Religion
- Affiliation: Shia Islam
- Ecclesiastical or organisational status: Friday mosque
- Status: Active

Location
- Location: Gorgan, Golestan Province
- Country: Iran
- Coordinates: 36°50′32″N 54°25′50″E

Architecture
- Type: Mosque architecture
- Style: Seljuk; Timurid; Safavid; Afsharid
- Completed: 1018 CE

Specifications
- Interior area: 1,600 m^{2} (17,000 sq ft)
- Dome: One (maybe more)
- Minaret: One
- Materials: Bricks; mortal; tiles

Iran National Heritage List
- Official name: Friday Mosque of Gorgan
- Type: Friday Mosque
- Designated: 1932
- Reference no.: 181
- Conservation organization: Cultural Heritage, Handicrafts and Tourism Organization of Iran

The Jameh Mosque of Gorgan (Persian: مسجد جامع گرگان; Arabic: جامع جرجان) is a Shi'ite Friday mosque, located next to the old bazaar, in the Nalbandan neighborhood of Gorgan, in the province of Golestan, Iran. The mosque was built in 1018 CE, during the Seljuk era, and has been extensively renovated in subsequent years.

The mosque was added to the Iran National Heritage List in 1932, administered by the Cultural Heritage, Handicrafts and Tourism Organization of Iran. In June 2023 it was reported that 170 billion rials (US$340,000) were needed to complete restoration of the mosque.

== Overview ==
The original structure of this mosque is located in the Nalbandan neighborhood. The construction of the mosque most likely coincides with that of the brick minaret, built in the Seljuk style. The mosque's spherical minaret is on the Kufic line.

The mosque was expanded, ornamented and renovated later, in the Timurid, Safavid, and Afsharid era styles and covers an area of 1,600 square metres (17,000 sq ft), including a large sahn, north and south facing portals, epigraphs, cuneiform inscriptions and other adornments on the brickwork. Inside the mosque, there is a carved wooden mihrab, and engraved decrees of both the Safavid and Afshar eras.

== Gallery ==
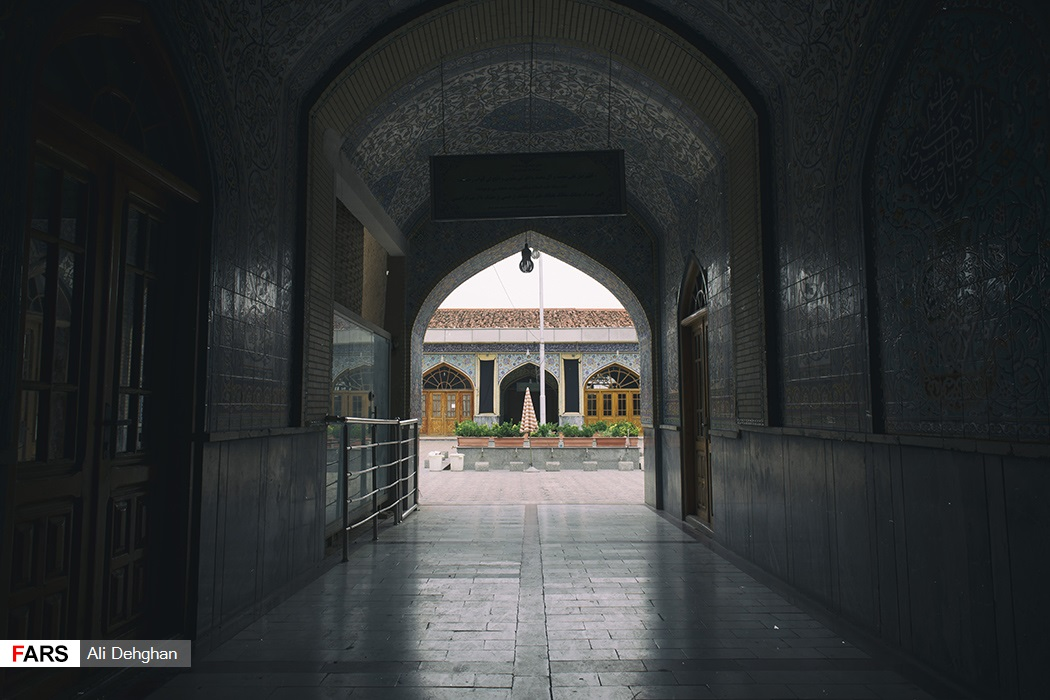
The entrance to the mosque

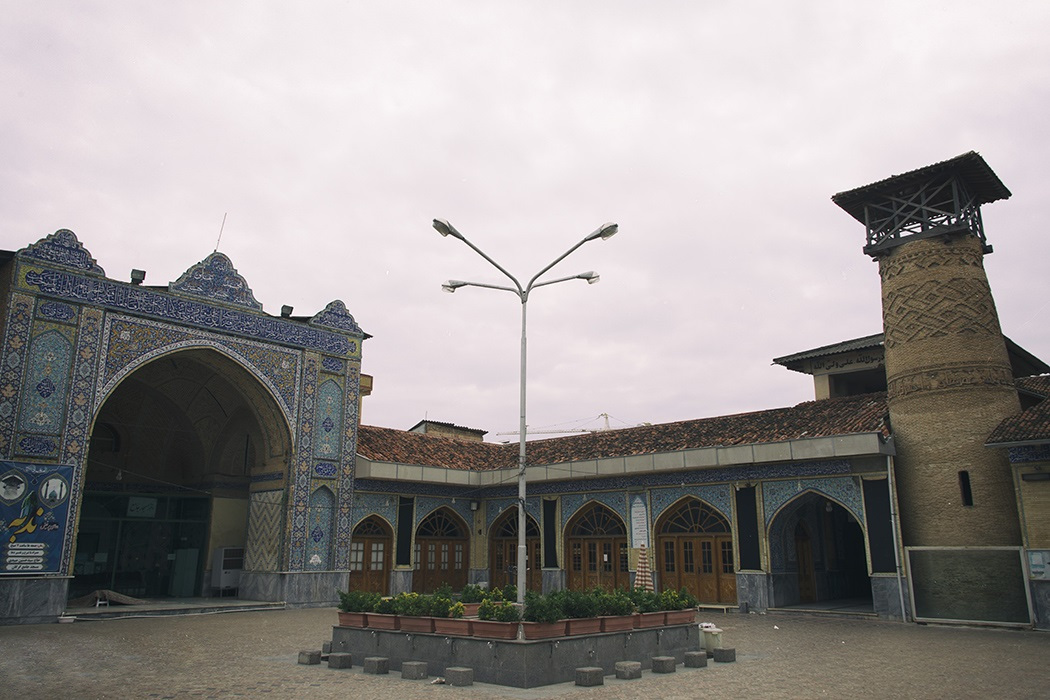
The mosque square

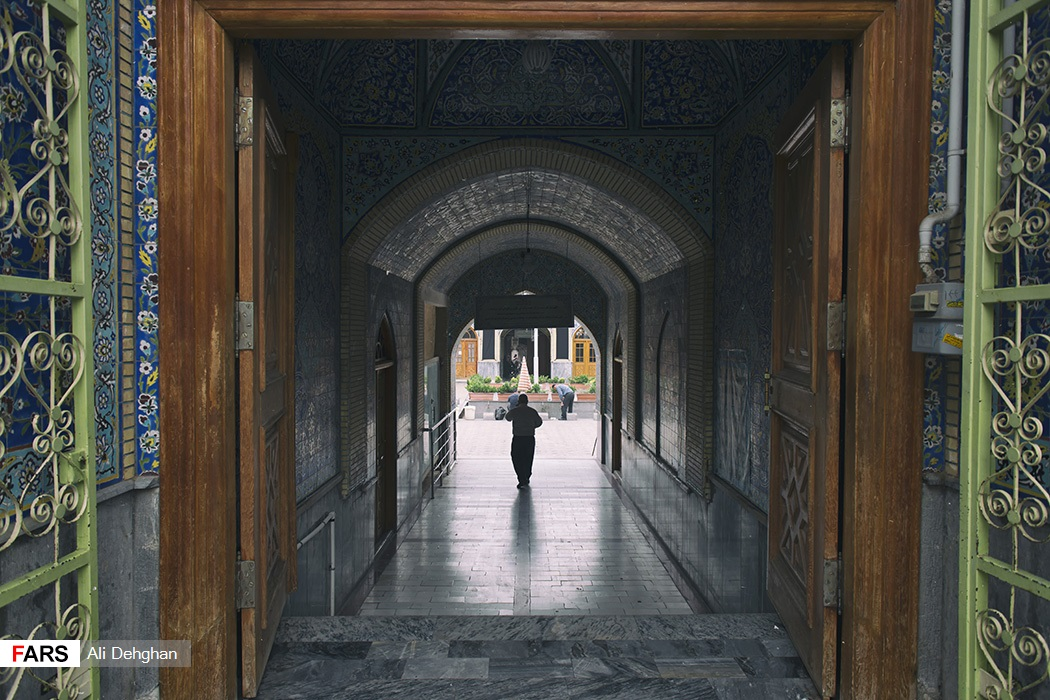
Exiting the mosque

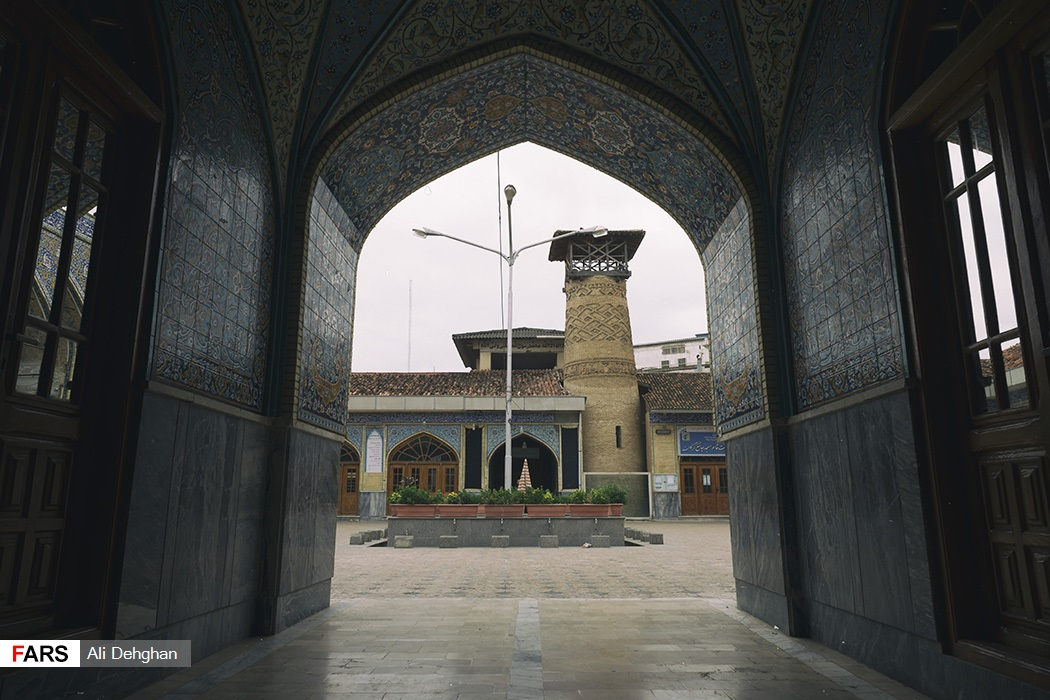
The mosque tower

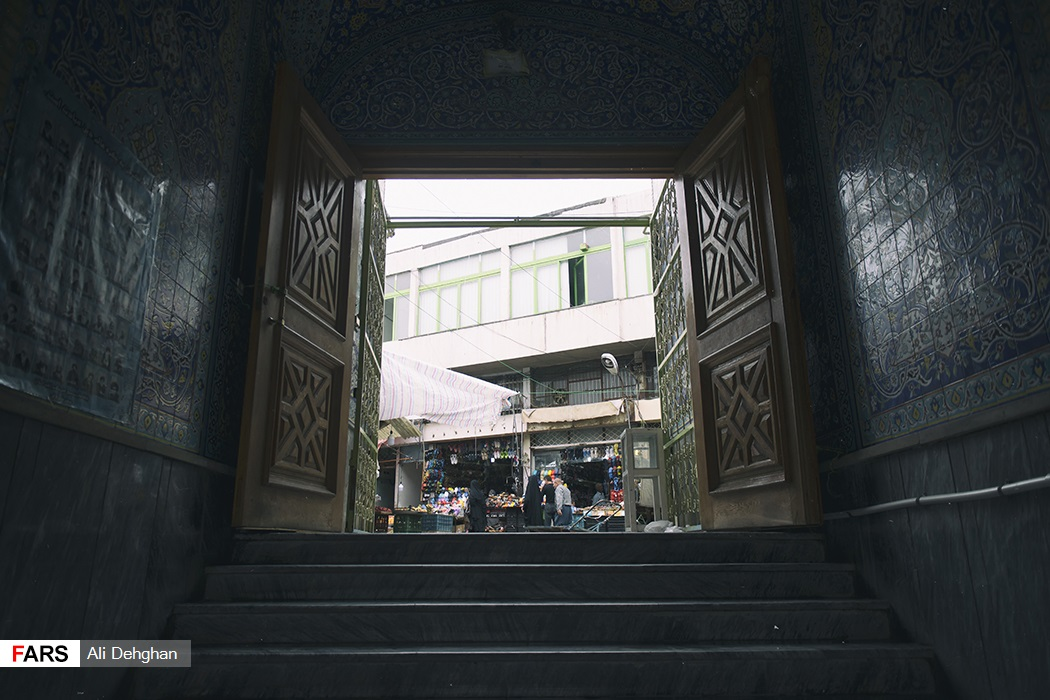

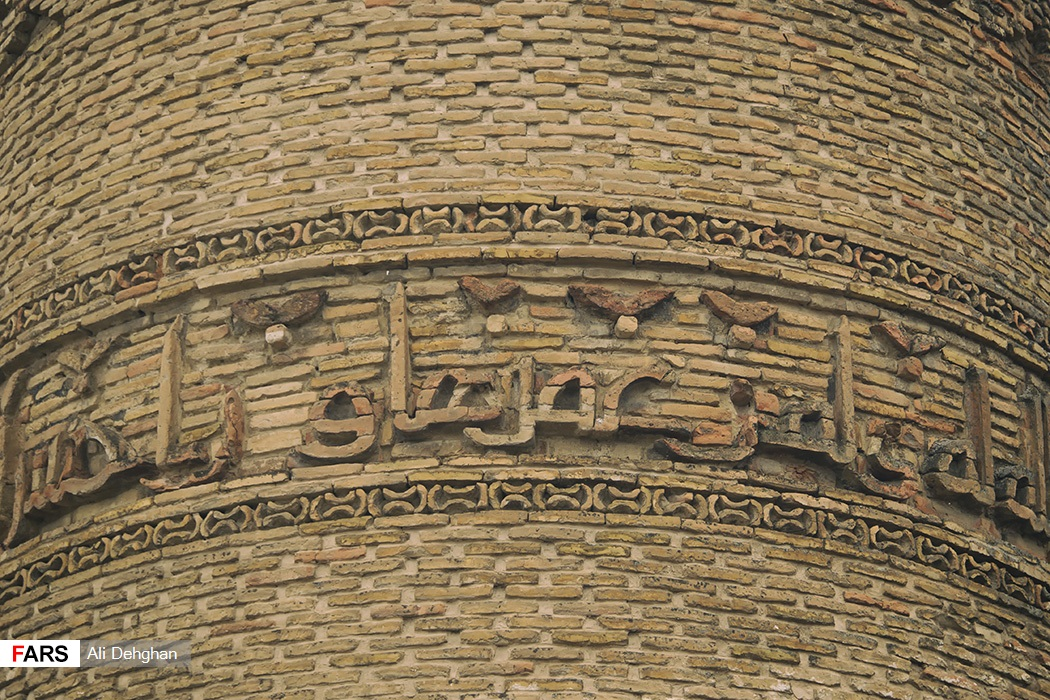

== See also ==
- Shia Islam in Iran
- List of mosques in Iran
