= Jameh Mosque of Germi =

Mosque in Germi, Ardabil, Iran

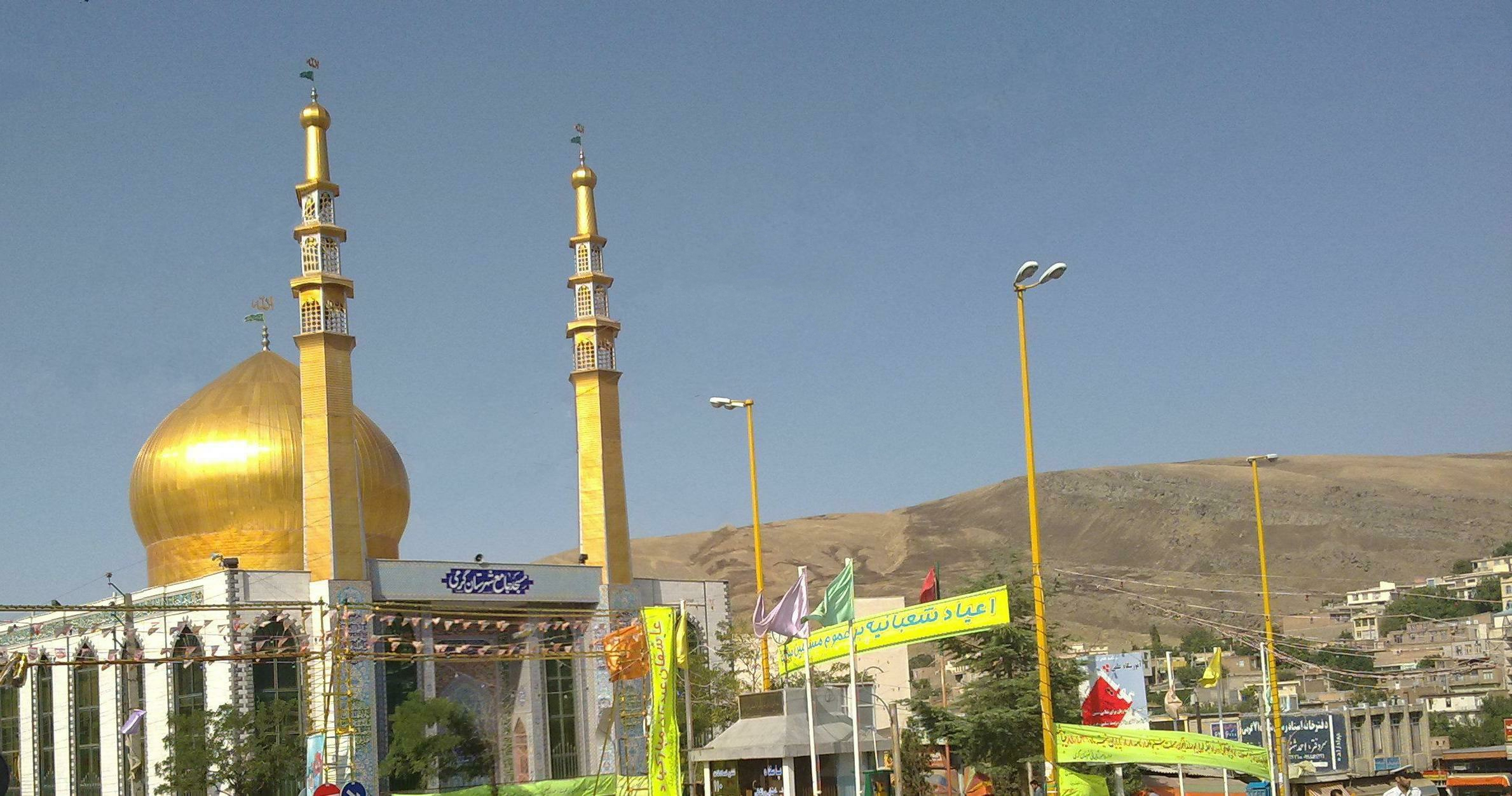
- The mosque in 2010

- Location of the mosque in Iran

Religion
- Affiliation: Shia Islam
- Ecclesiastical or organizational status: Friday mosque
- Status: Active

Location
- Location: Germi, Ardabil
- Country: Iran
- Interactive map of Jameh Mosque of Germi
- Coordinates: 39°01′25″N 48°04′42″E

Architecture
- Type: Mosque architecture
- Style: Seljuq
- Completed: Seljuq era

Specifications
- Dome: One (maybe more)
- Minaret: Two

The Jameh Mosque of Germi (Persian: مسجدجامع گرمی) is a Shia Friday mosque, located in Germi, in the province of Ardabil, Iran. The mosque was completed during the Seljuq era and was renovated in 2019.

== See also ==
- Shia Islam in Iran
- List of mosques in Iran
