= Jameh Mosque of Arsanjan =

Mosque in Arsanjan, Fars, Iran

- مسجد جامع ارسنجان
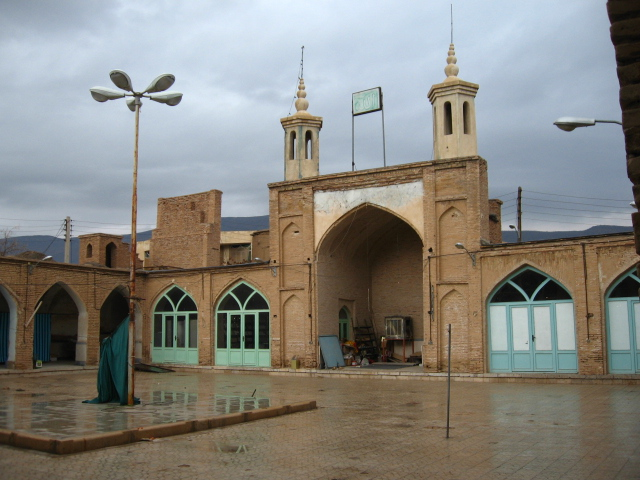
- The mosque in 2006

- Location of the mosque in Iran

Religion
- Affiliation: Shia Islam
- Ecclesiastical or organizational status: Friday mosque
- Status: Active

Location
- Location: Arsanjan, Fars
- Country: Iran
- Interactive map of Jameh Mosque of Arsanjan
- Coordinates: 29°54′51″N 53°18′25.5″E

Architecture
- Type: Mosque architecture
- Style: Safavid
- Completed: Safavid era

Specifications
- Dome: Six (maybe more)
- Minaret: Two
- Materials: Bricks

Iran National Heritage List
- Official name: Friday Mosque of Arsanjan
- Type: Built
- Designated: 23 July 2007
- Reference no.: 19301
- Conservation organization: Cultural Heritage, Handicrafts and Tourism Organization of Iran

The Jameh Mosque of Arsanjan (Persian: مسجد جامع ارسنجان; Arabic: جامع أرسنجان) is a Shi'ite Friday mosque, located on Saadiya Avenue, Arsanjan, in the province of Fars, Iran. The mosque is date from the Safavid era.

The mosque was added to the Iran National Heritage List on 23 July 2007, administered by the Cultural Heritage, Handicrafts and Tourism Organization of Iran.

== See also ==
- Shia Islam in Iran
- List of mosques in Iran
