= Jameh Mosque of Kabir Neyriz =

Mosque in Neyriz, Fars, Iran

- مسجد جامع کبیر نی‌ریز
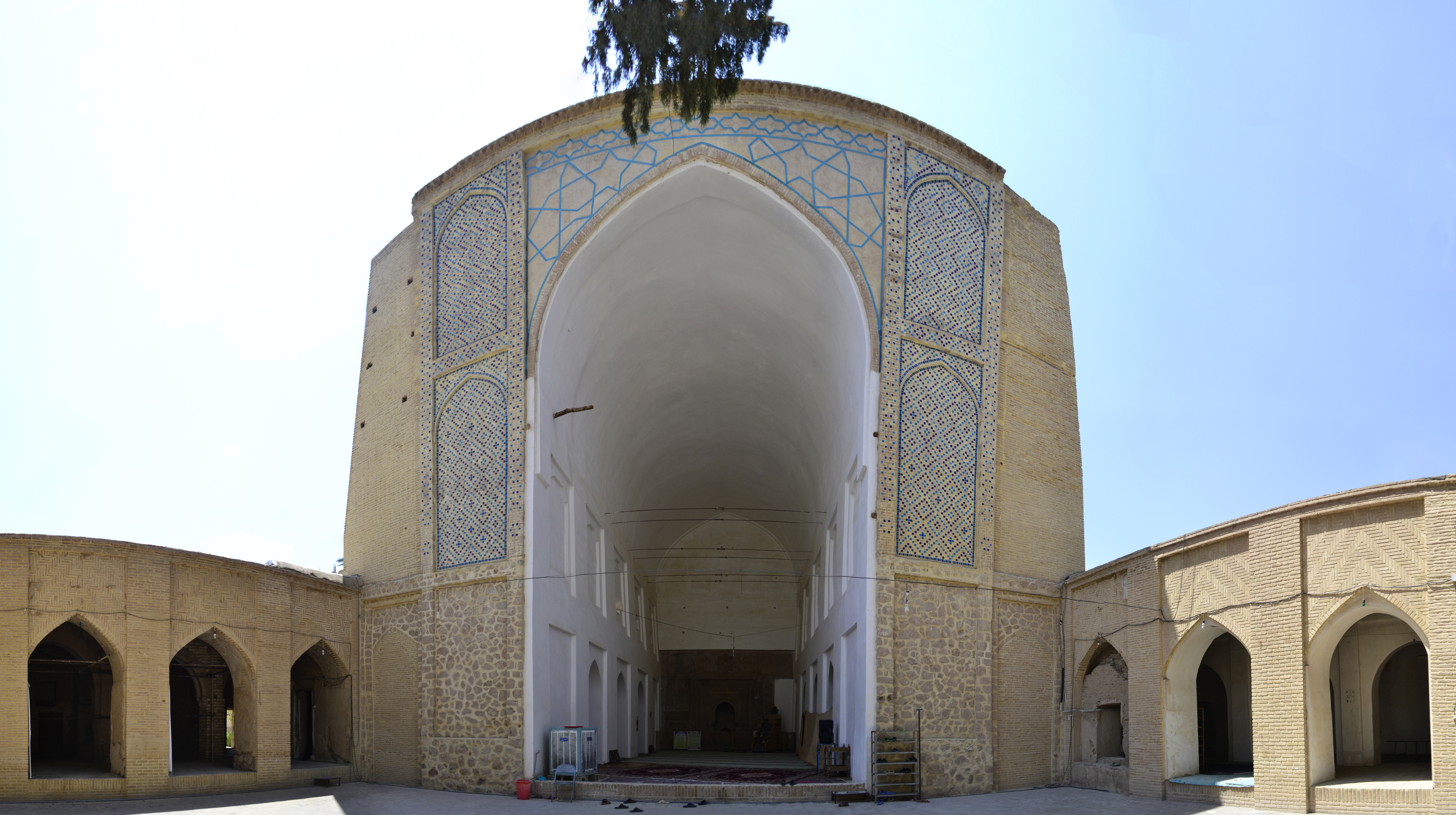
- A mosque iwan, in 2012

- Location of the mosque in Iran

Religion
- Affiliation: Shia Islam
- Ecclesiastical or organisational status: Friday mosque
- Status: Active

Location
- Location: Neyriz, Fars
- Country: Iran
- Coordinates: 29°11′30″N 54°19′08″E

Architecture
- Architects: Al-Muqaddasi (iwan, south)
- Type: Mosque architecture
- Style: Buyid; Seljuq (renovation); Ilkhanid (renovation); Timurid (portal, east); Safavid (renovation)
- Completed: 340 AH (951/952 CE) (iwan, south); 363 AH (973/974 CE) (mihrab); 460 AH (1067/1068 CE) (renovation); 560 AH (1164/1165 CE) (renovation); 876 AH (1471/1472 CE) (portal, east)

Specifications
- Dome: One
- Minaret: One
- Materials: Clay-covered baked bricks; polychrome tiles; stucco

Iran National Heritage List
- Official name: Friday Mosque of Neyriz
- Type: Friday Mosque
- Designated: 1933
- Reference no.: 192
- Conservation organization: Cultural Heritage, Handicrafts and Tourism Organization of Iran

The Jameh Mosque of Kabir Neyriz (Persian: مسجد جامع کبیر نی‌ریز, romanized: Masjid-i Jami' Neyriz) is a Shi'ite Friday mosque, located in Neyriz, in the province of Fars, Iran. Construction of the mosque commenced during the Buyid era, most likely in 340 AH (951/952 CE), and was completed in 876 AH (1471/1472 CE), during the Safavid era. The mosque has a mix of architectural styles, and was predominately completed in the Seljuq style.

The mosque was added to the Iran National Heritage List in 1933, administered by the Cultural Heritage, Handicrafts and Tourism Organization of Iran. In February 2025, the Neyriz Friday Mosque was one of eight historic mosques from Fars province that were considered by Iranian officials for possible nomination to UNESCO as World Heritage Sites.

== Architecture ==
The Friday mosque of Neyriz was built in phases that span Buyid, Seljuk, Il-Khanid, Timurid, and Safavid rule in the Fars province. An inscription on the great qibla iwan indicates that the mihrab was built in 973 CE, which is probably the date when the qibla iwan and the minaret were also constructed and enclosed within precinct walls.

Identified as an "iwan-mosque," the pre-Islamic typology of the Masjid-i Jami' in Neyriz, Bamiyan, and Nishapur has led some scholars to believe that their mihrabs and minarets may have been appended to Zoroastrian fire temples. At Neyriz, the northwest iwan facing the original sanctuary was erected at a later date, followed by the addition of two rows of lateral arcades along the sahn and iwan walls. The portal, which bears the date 1472 CE, commemorates the last known period of construction.

The mosque is rectangular in plan, measuring approximately 48 by 34 metres (157 by 112 ft) on the exterior. It is aligned with qibla along the northwest-southeast axis and is centered on an arcaded sahn that is 15 metres (49 ft) long and 18.5 metres (61 ft) wide. Entered from a simple portal at the northern end of the northwest façade, the sahn is dominated by the tall sanctuary iwan that occupies its southwest wing. The sanctuary iwan is 11 metres (36 ft) wide and 17 metres (56 ft) deep, and is vaulted at a height double that of the flat-roofed sahn arcades that continue along its side walls. The archways connecting the iwan to the arcades were pierced when the latter were constructed. The sanctuary iwan also dominates the exterior appearance of the mosque with its projecting buttresses.

Across the sahn from the sanctuary is the vaulted northeast iwan, which is 7 square metres (75 sq ft). It is flanked by passageways on either side that connect it with the main portal and with a secondary portal, which was added to the eastern corner of the mosque in 1472 CE. It is adjoined by the modern addition of two halls that span the length of the southeast mosque wall; the southern of these halls contains ablution fountains and latrines. There is also an octagonal fountain at the center of the sahn. A single minaret, with a round tapering shaft terminating at a parapet, rises alongside the main portal. The spiraling steps of the minaret are accessed from the northwest arcade.

The mosque is made of baked bricks, covered with clay on the exterior and plastered white on the interior. The sahn façade of the great iwan is ornamented simply with polychrome tiles composed into geometric patterns. Inside, the decorative effort is focused on the mihrab niche on the qibla wall, which is framed with multiple bands of ornate arabesques and inscriptions carved in relief out of stucco. The original minbar, probably wooden, has been replaced.

== Gallery ==
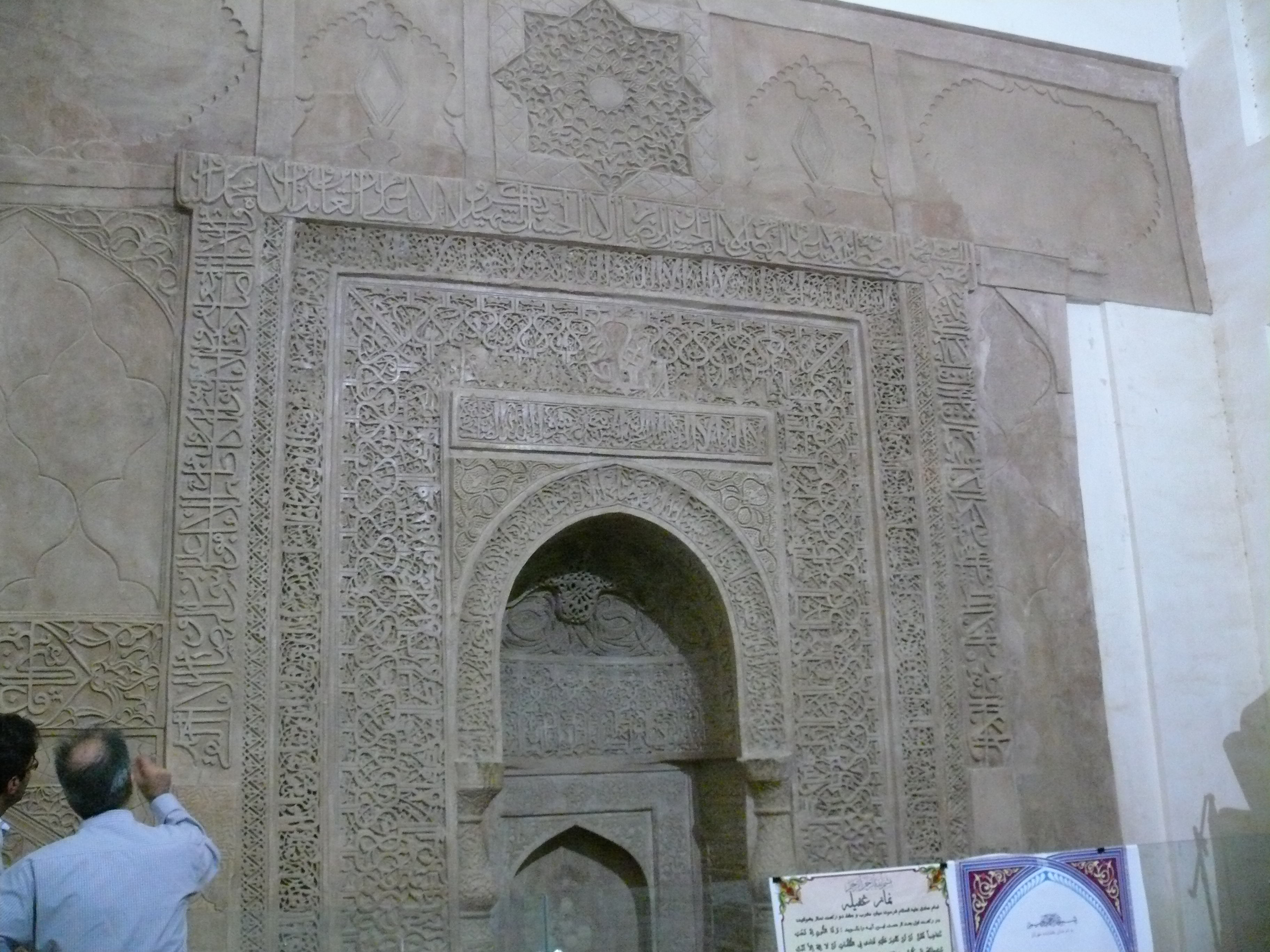
Partially restored qibla iwan in 2018

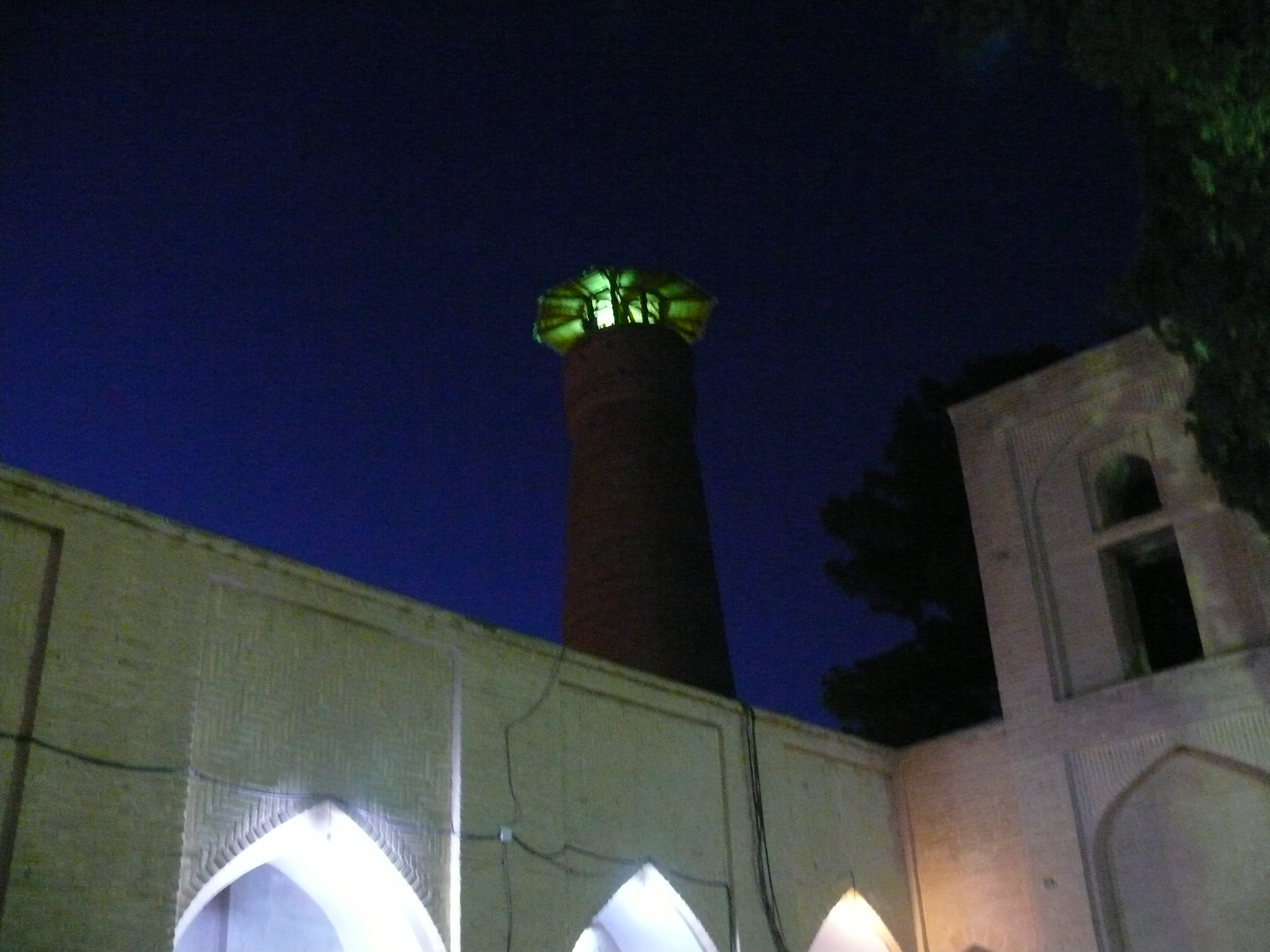
The minaret at night

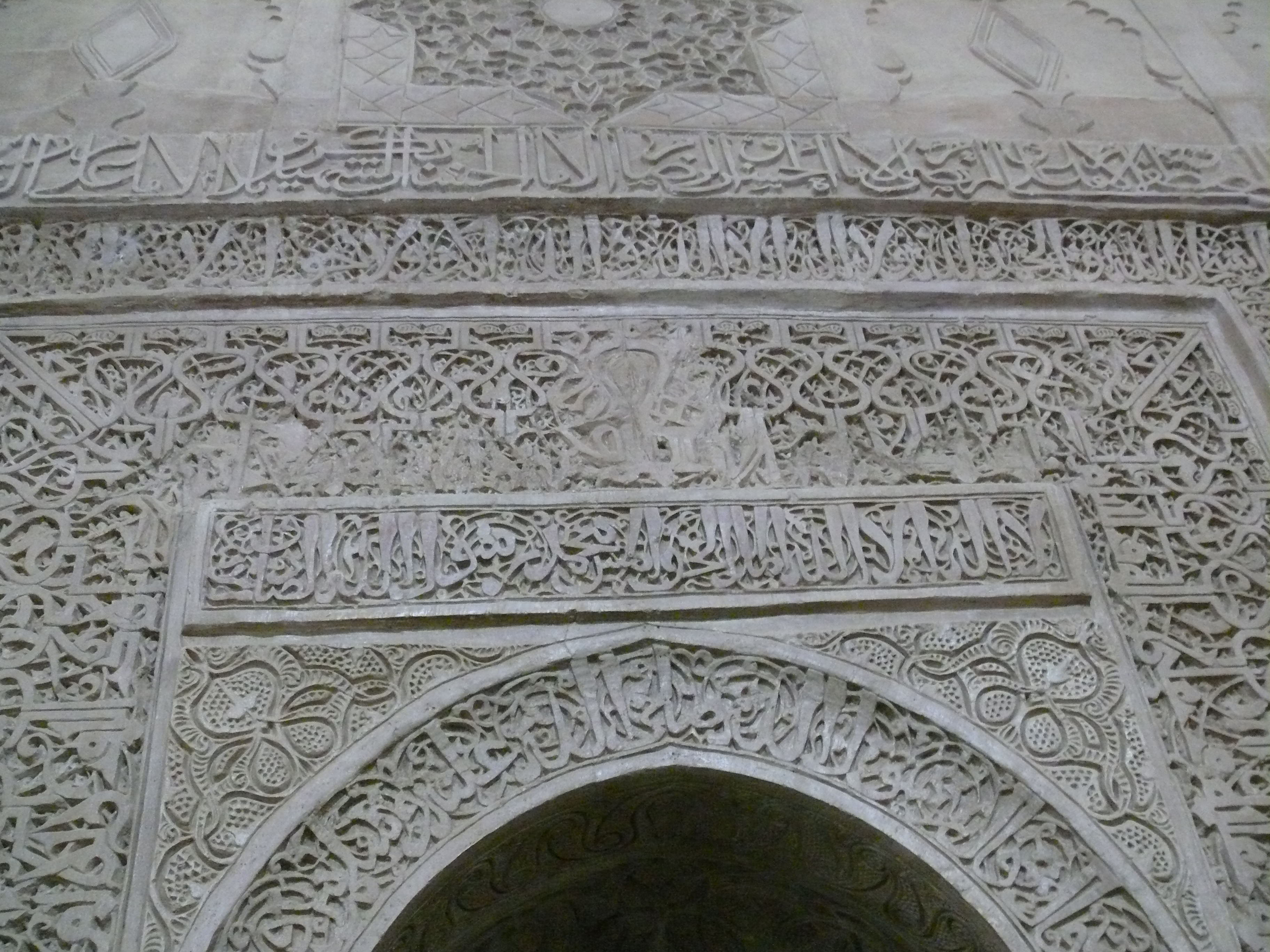
Inscription on the iwan

== See also ==
- Shia Islam in Iran
- List of mosques in Iran
