= Imamzadeh Shahreza =

Shi'ite shrine and mosque in Isfahan province, Iran

- امامزاده شاه‌رضا
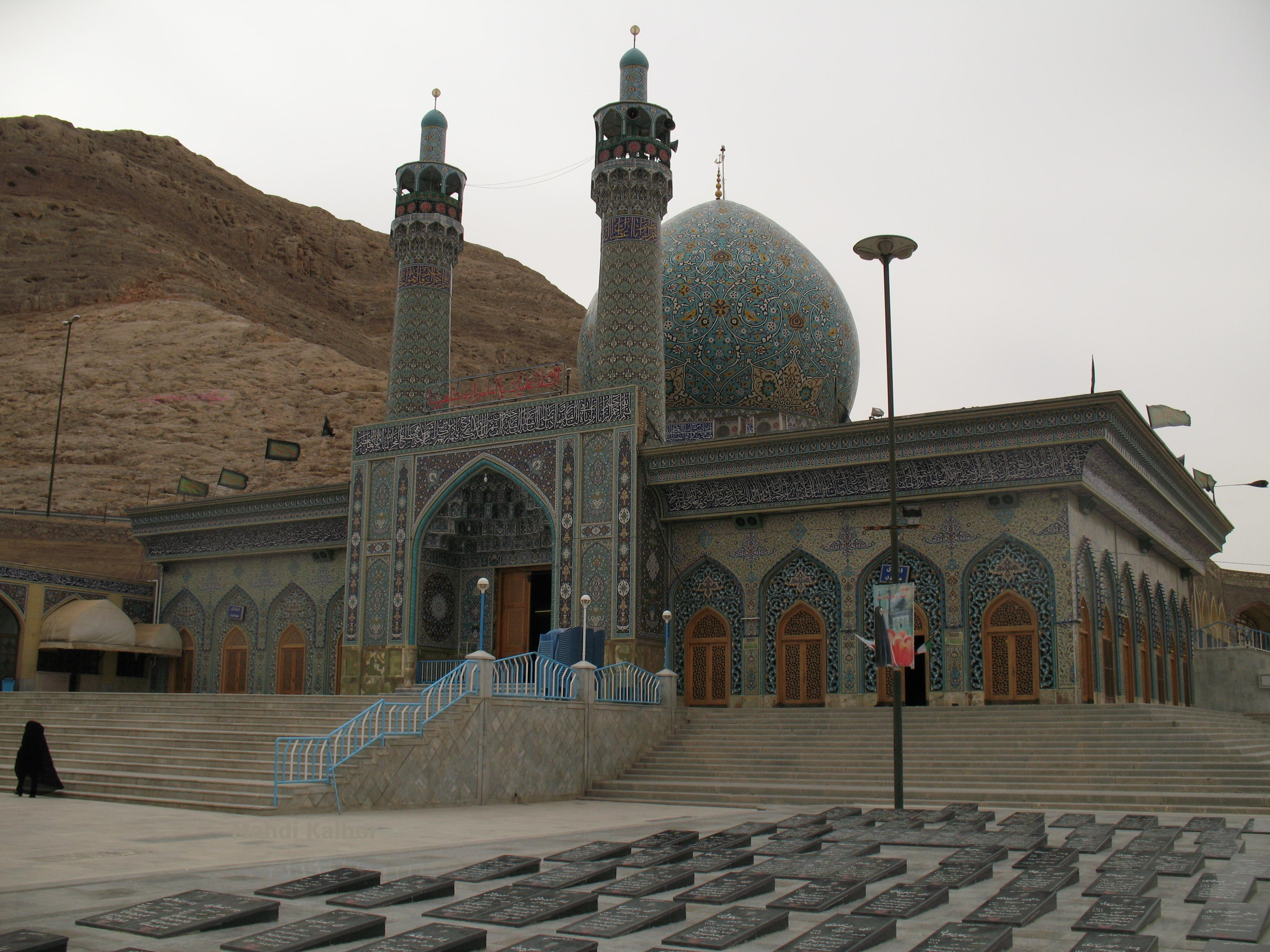
- The shrine in 2009

- Location in Iran

Religion
- Affiliation: Shia Islam
- Ecclesiastical or organisational status: Imamzadeh
- Status: Active

Location
- Location: Shahreza, Isfahan Province
- Country: Iran
- Coordinates: 32°2′1.5″N 51°52′39″E

Architecture
- Type: Mosque architecture
- Style: Safavid

Specifications
- Dome: One (maybe more)
- Minaret: Two

Iran National Heritage List
- Official name: Emamzadeh Shahreza
- Type: Emamzadeh
- Designated: 1932
- Reference no.: 130
- Conservation organization: Cultural Heritage, Handicrafts and Tourism Organization of Iran

The Imamzadeh Shahreza (Persian: امامزاده شاه‌رضا; Arabic: مرقد شهرضا) is a Shia imamzadeh, located in Shahreza, in the province of Isfahan, Iran. The imamzadeh was completed during the Safavid era. The complex was added to the Iran National Heritage List on 6 January 1932, administered by the Cultural Heritage, Handicrafts and Tourism Organization of Iran. It is a holy site in Shia Islam.

== See also ==
- Shia Islam in Iran
- List of mosques in Iran
