= List of mosques in Tabriz =

This is a list of mosques in Tabriz, in the province of East Azerbaijan, Iran, sorted in era of completion.

Era	Mosque name	Image	Year (where known)	Comments	Notes
Pre-Islamic	Marand Jame' Mosque				
Caliphate	Ark Mosque		724 CE		
Caliphate	Asnaq mosque				
Sallarid	[icon]				
Ghaznavids	[icon]				
Seljuq	Ahar Jame' Mosque				
Khwarezm	[icon]				
Ilkhanate	Arg of Tabriz		c. 1320 CE	Former mosque, active between the 14th and 17th centuries; subsequently used as a citadel. Listed on INHL.	
Chupanids	Mosque of Master and Student		1430 CE	Shi'ite mosque, in current use. Listed on INHL.	
Kara Koyunlu	Blue Mosque		c. 1480s CE	Former mosque, active between the 15th and 18th centuries; now partially preserved as a museum. Listed on INHL.	
Ak Koyunlu	[icon]				
Timurids	Jamal Abad mosque				
Safavids	Imamzadeh Hamzah			Twelver Sh‘ah Imamzadeh and mosque complex that contains the grave of Hamzah, son of Musa al-Kazim.	
Safavids	Hajj Safar Ali Mosque				
Safavids	Jameh Mosque of Tabriz			Shi'ite mosque, in current use. Listed on INHL.	
Safavids	Mausoleum of Awn ibn Ali			Twelver Sh‘ah Imamzadeh and mausoleum complex that contains the graves of the two sons of Ali ibn Abi Talib.	
Safavids	Mehr Abad Mosque				
Safavids	Molla Rostam Mosque				
Safavids	Tasooj Jame' Mosque				
Zand	Saheb-ol-Amr Mosque		1636 CE	Shi'ite mosque, in current use. Listed on INHL.	
Afsharids	[icon]				
Qajars	Shohada Mosque			Shi'ite mosque, in current use. Listed on INHL.	
Pahlavi	[icon]				
Modern	[icon]				

== Unknown eras ==
Mosque name	Image	Comments	Notes
Ainaly Mosque			
Ajabshir Jame Mosque			
Hajat mosque			
Imamzadeh Sayyid Muhammad Kojajani		Twelver Sh‘ah Imamzadeh and mosque complex that contains the grave of Shams al-Din Sayyid Muhammad ben Sadiq ben Muhammad, a descendant of Zayn al-‘Ābidīn.	
Mianeh Jame Mosque			
