= Emamzadeh Ebrahim, Kashan =

Emamzadeh Ebrahim
- امامزاده ابراهیم
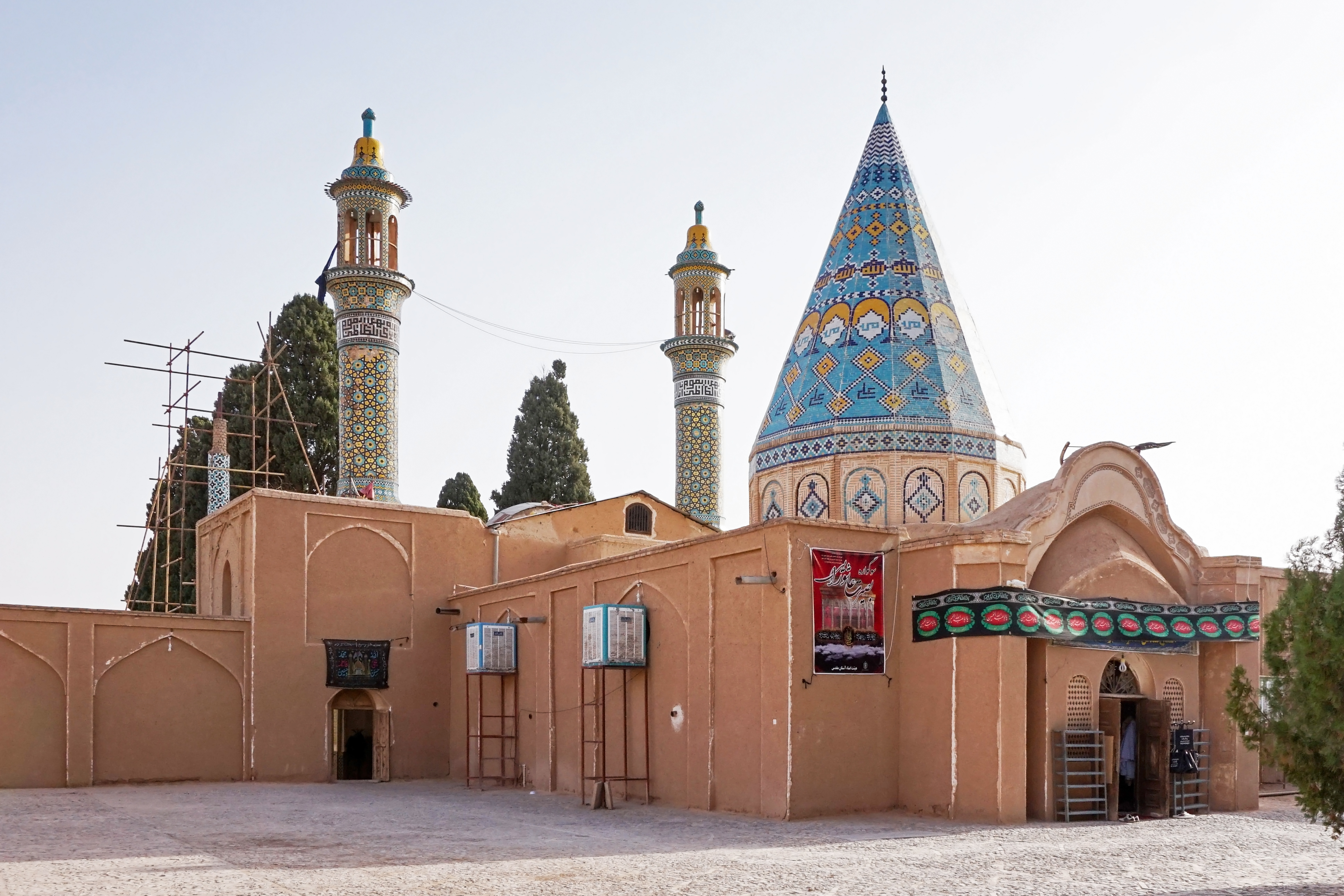

- Location of the complex in Iran

Religion
- Affiliation: Shia Islam
- Ecclesiastical or organisational status: Imamzadeh
- Status: Active

Location
- Location: Kashan, Isfahan Province
- Country: Iran
- Interactive map of Emamzadeh Ebrahim
- Coordinates: 33°57′31″N 51°23′12″E

Architecture
- Type: Islamic architecture
- Style: Qajar
- Completed: 1895 CE

Specifications
- Dome: One
- Minaret: Two
- Materials: Bricks; mortar; tiles

Iran National Heritage List
- Official name: Emamzadeh Ebrahim
- Type: Emamzadeh
- Designated: 1956
- Reference no.: 401
- Conservation organization: Cultural Heritage, Handicrafts and Tourism Organization of Iran

The Emamzadeh Ebrahim (Persian: امامزاده ابراهیم) is a Shi'ite funerary monument and religious complex, located in Kashan, in the province of Isfahan, Iran. The emamzadeh was completed in 1895 CE, during the Qajar era, and is known for its turquoise dome, tiled minarets, pleasant sahn and beautiful iwan. Paintings, tiles and decorations with cut mirrors have been added later in the early 20th century.

The complex was added to the Iran National Heritage List on 1 February 1956, administered by the Cultural Heritage, Handicrafts and Tourism Organization of Iran.

== Overview ==
The current changed structure of the emamzadeh is a work of architects in the recent century. On the inscription of the door, it has been mentioned about the decorating with cut mirrors by the order of then governor of Kashan. The other inscription is about the ancestry of the imamzadeh, who has been buried there and he was apparently a descendant of Musa al-Kadhim. In the inscription, it is written also the name of the structure's founder, Khaleh Beygom. Khaleh Beygom's grave is also in the building and there are a few poems on her gravestone.

== Gallery ==
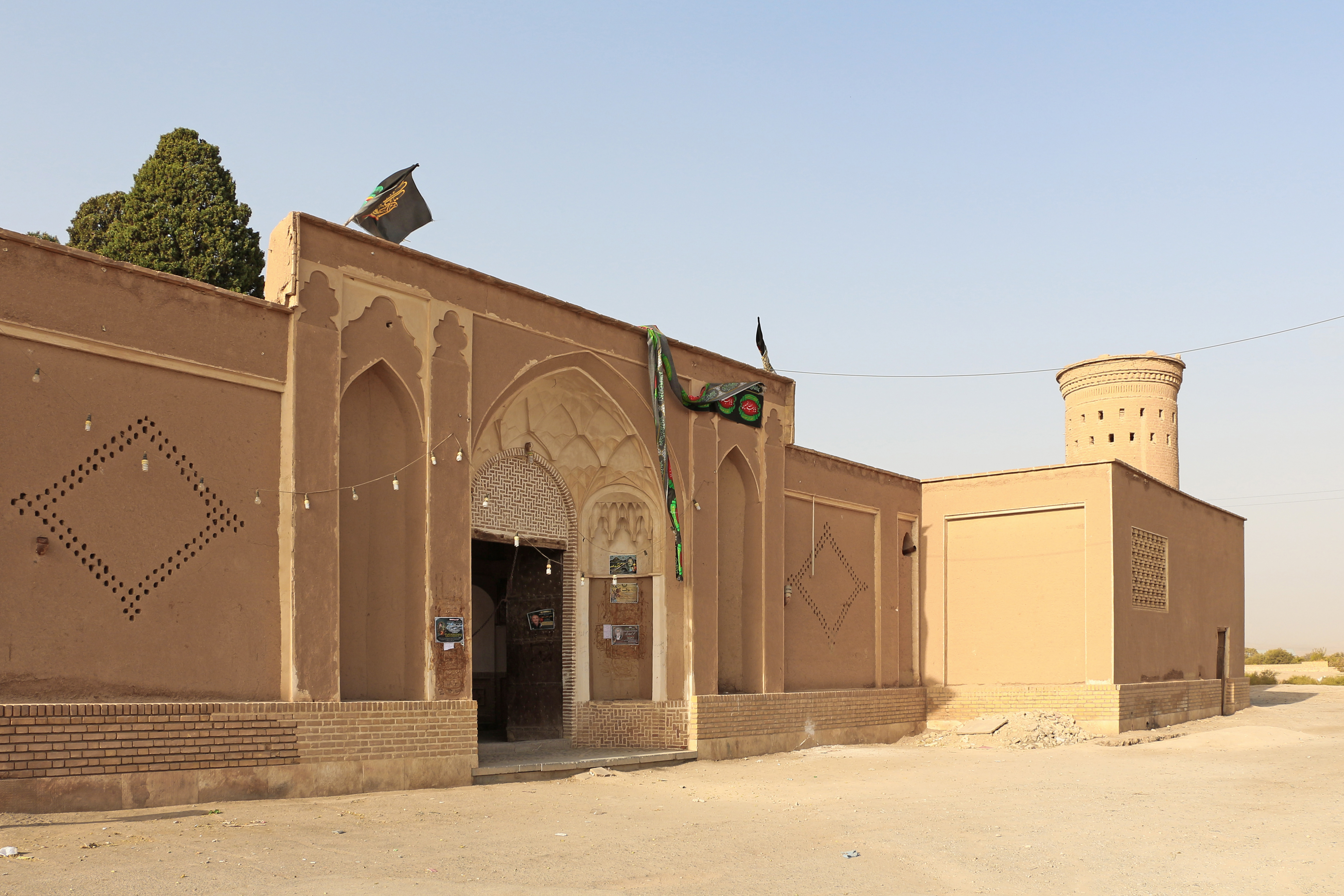
Exterior

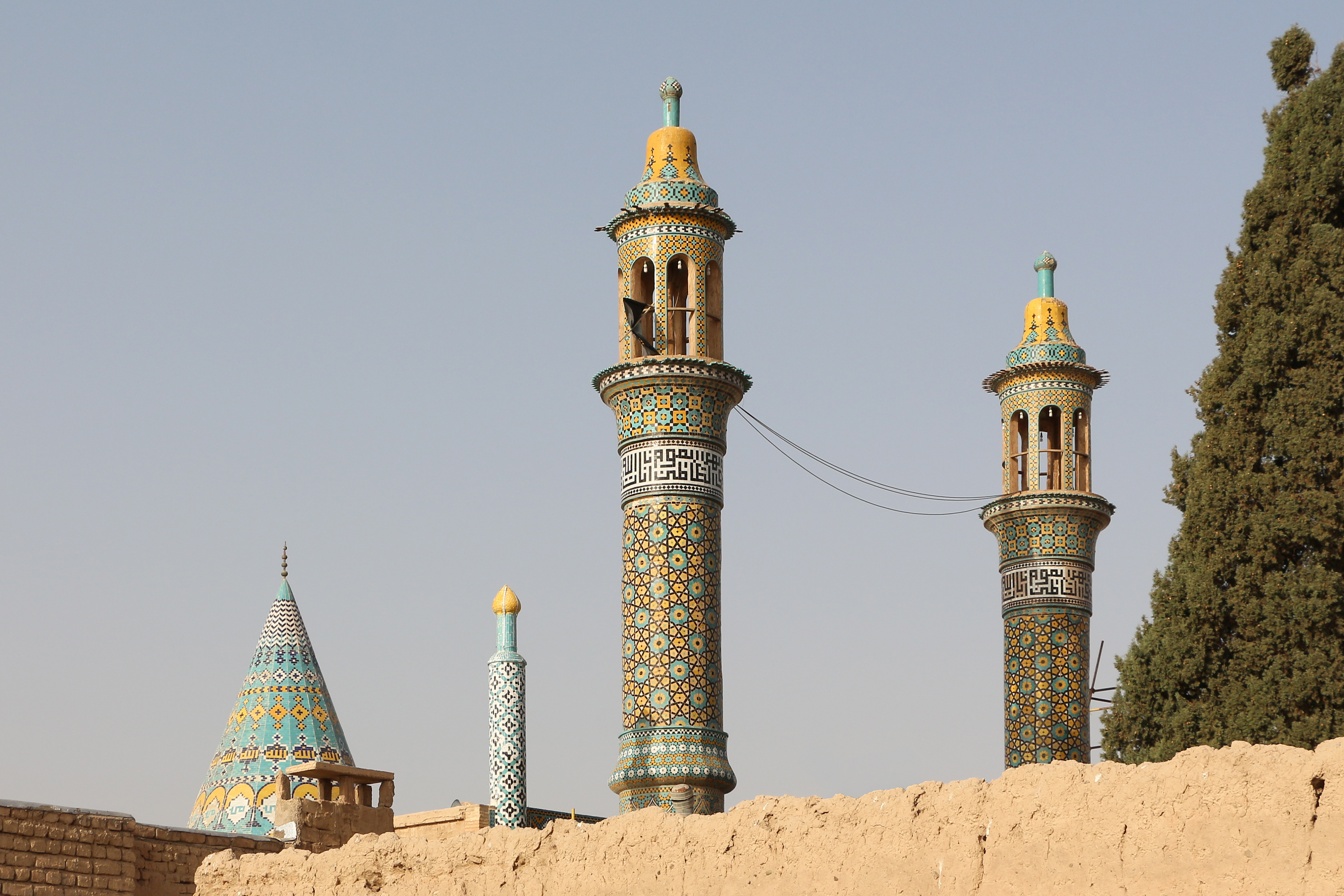
Minarets

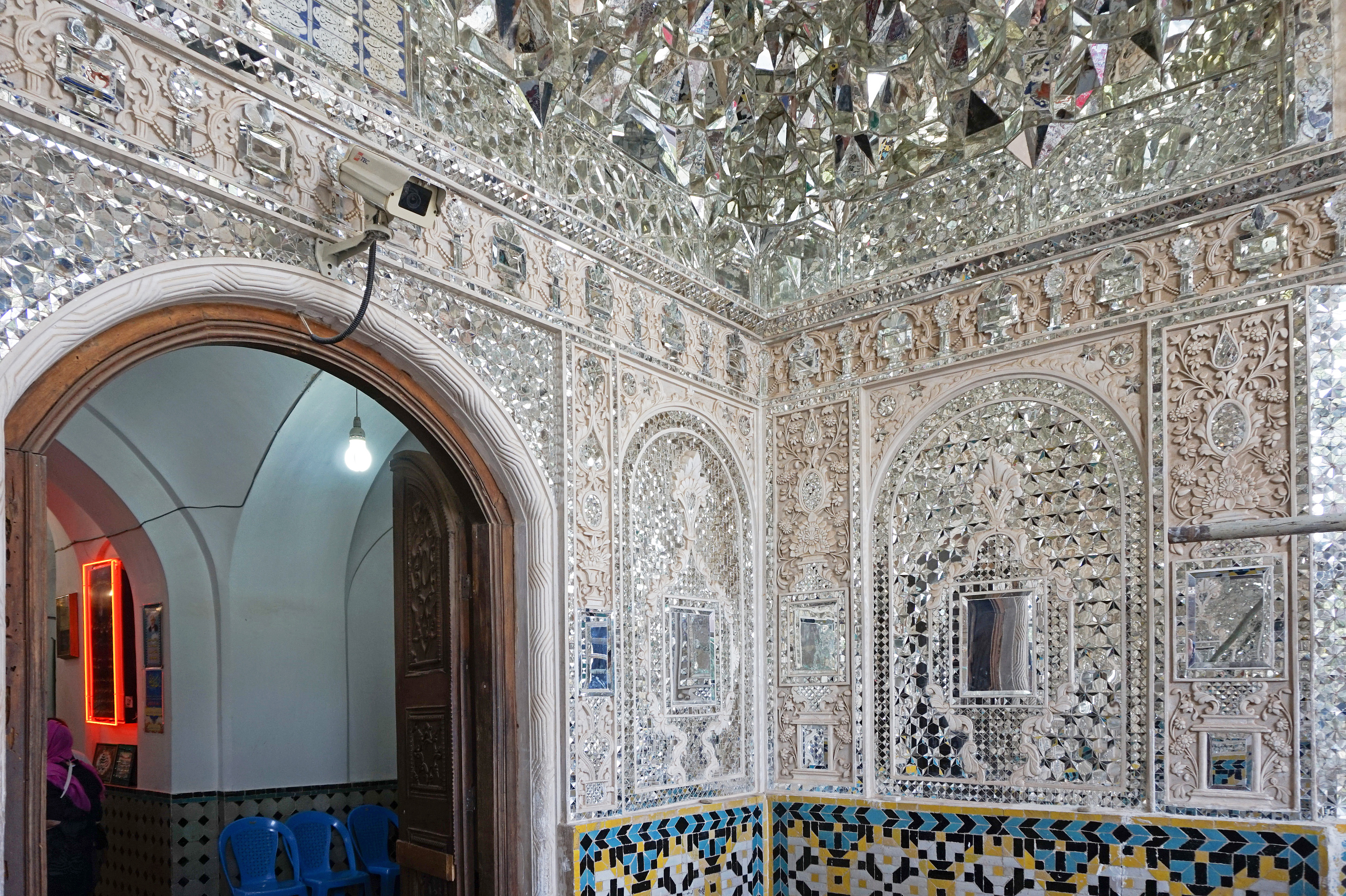
Interior

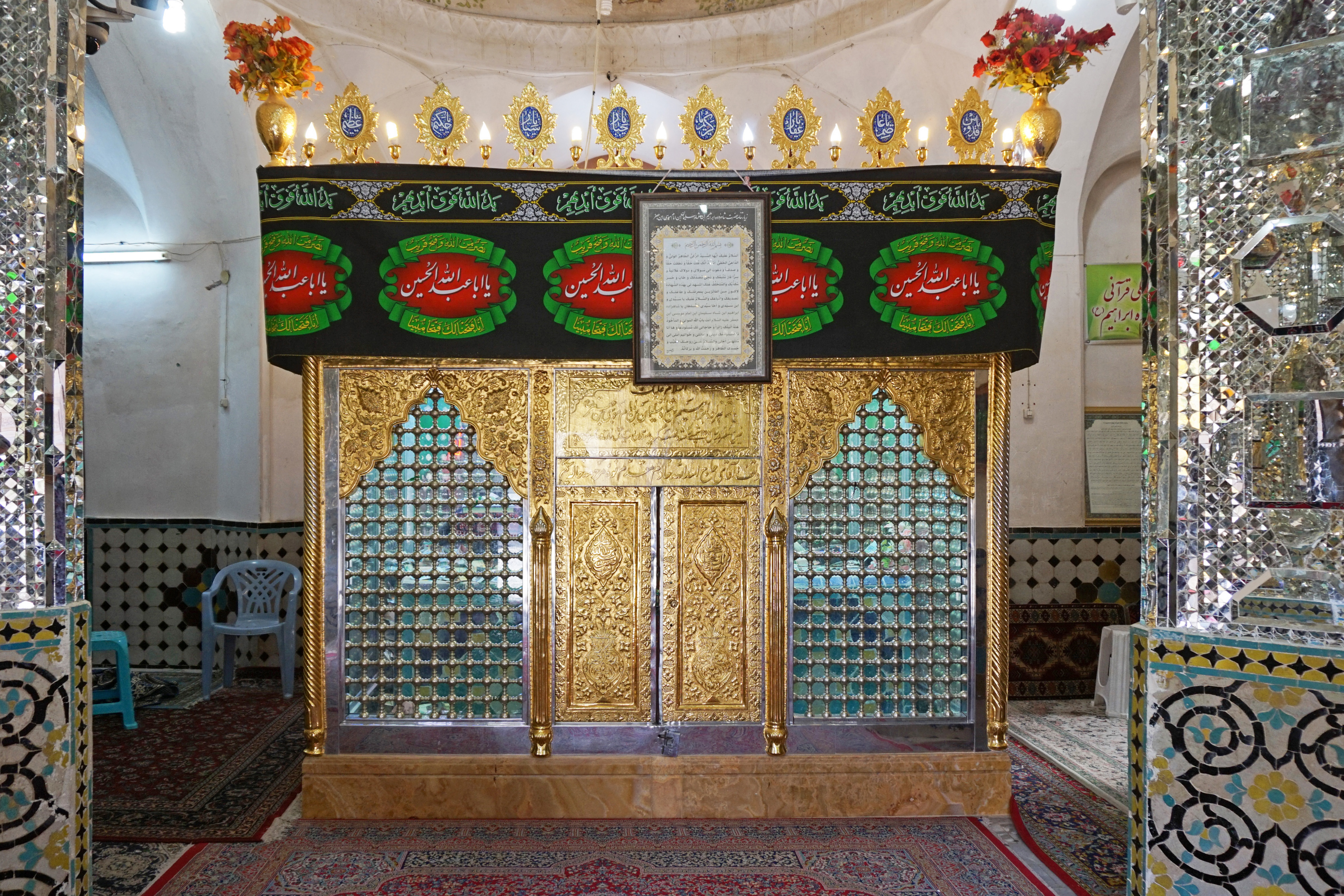
Shrine

== See also ==
- List of imamzadehs in Iran
- List of the historical structures in the Isfahan province
- Shia Islam in Iran
