= Mausoleum of Shah Abbas I =

National heritage site in Kashan, Iran

Mausoleum of Shah Abbas I the Great
- آرامگاه شاه عباس بزرگ
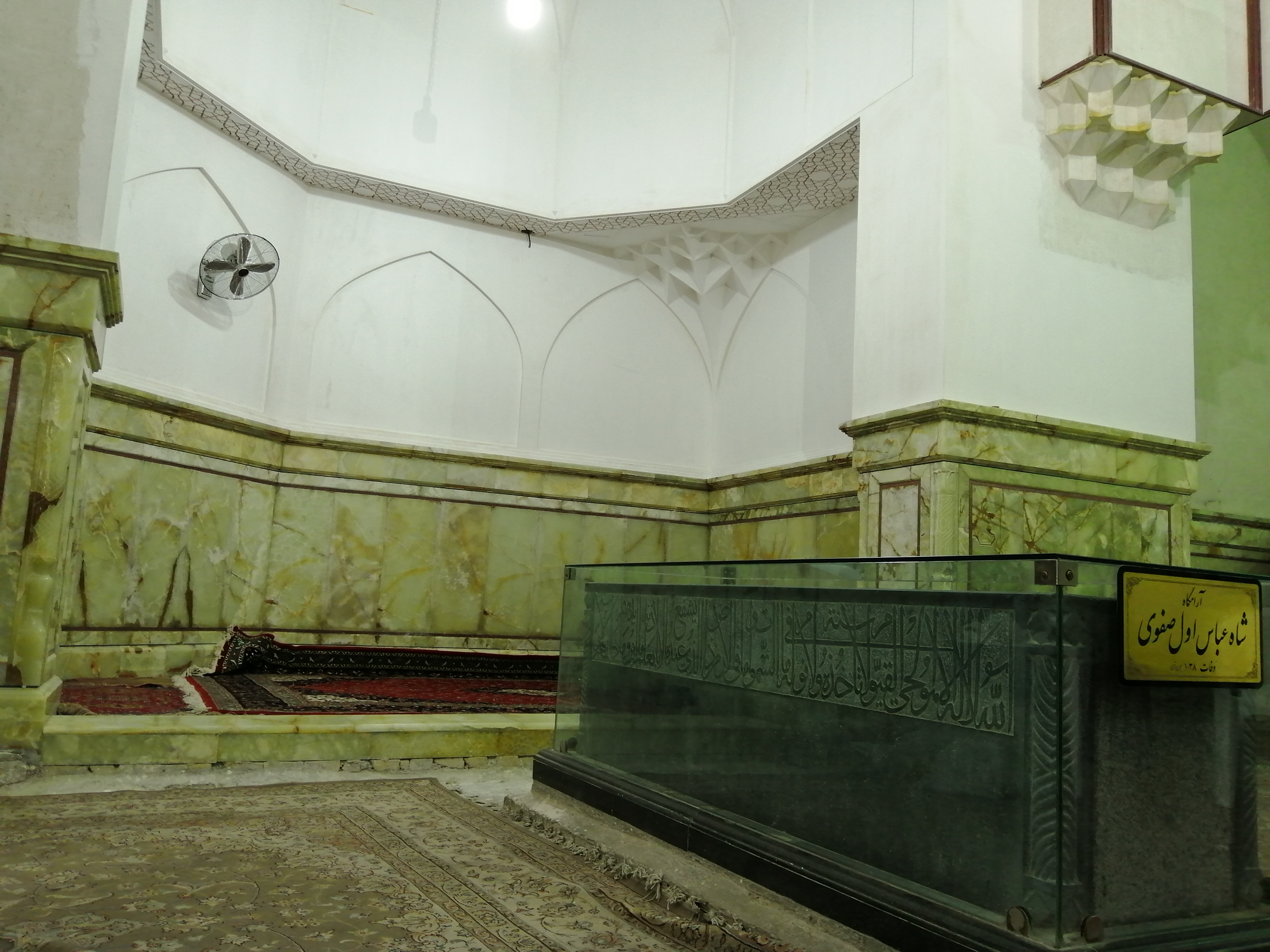

- Location of the mausoleum in Iran

Religion
- Affiliation: Shia Islam
- Ecclesiastical or organisational status: Mausoleum and imamzadeh

Location
- Location: Kashan, Isfahan province
- Country: Iran
- Interactive map of Mausoleum of Shah Abbas I the Great
- Coordinates: 33°58′53″N 51°26′23″E

Architecture
- Type: Islamic architecture
- Style: Seljuk; Ilkhanid; Safavid
- Established: c. 12th century CE; 1272 CE (tiling); 17th century (renovation); 1909 (zarih); 21st century (reconstruction)

Specifications
- Dome: One
- Minaret: Two (maybe more)
- Monument: One: Abbas the Great
- Materials: Bricks; mortar; tiles

Iran National Heritage List
- Official name: Mausoleum of Shah Abbas I the Great
- Type: Mausoleum
- Designated: 1935
- Reference no.: 237
- Conservation organization: Cultural Heritage, Handicrafts and Tourism Organization of Iran

The Mausoleum of Shah Abbas I (Persian: آرامگاه شاه عباس بزرگ), also known as Imamzadeh Habib ibn Mussa, (Note: Other names include the Shah Abbas I Mausoleum and the Imamzadeh Habib (Kashan).) is a Shi'ite mausoleum and imamzadeh complex, located in Kashan, Isfahan province, Iran. The structure is the resting place of Abbas the Great, the fifth shah of Safavid Iran.

The mausoleum was added to the Iran National Heritage List on 7 December 1935 and is administered by the Cultural Heritage, Handicrafts and Tourism Organization of Iran.

== Overview ==
According to the dates on the mihrab of the tomb, the primary structure was built before the 12th century. The structure was expanded during the Safavid era. The southwestern portico features a rectangular stone which originates in the Caucasus.

== Gallery ==
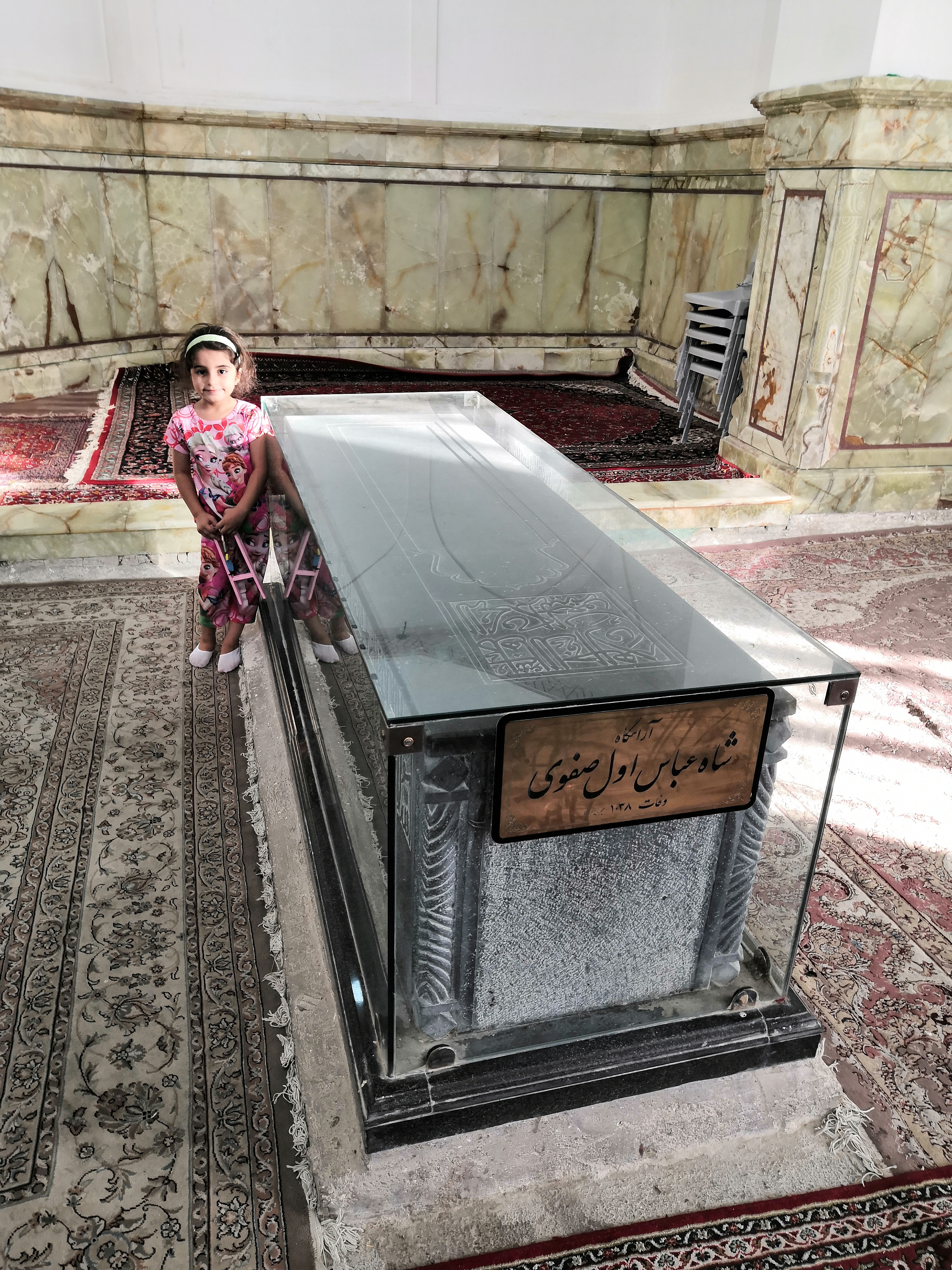
A child standing next to the tomb of Abbas the Great, 2019

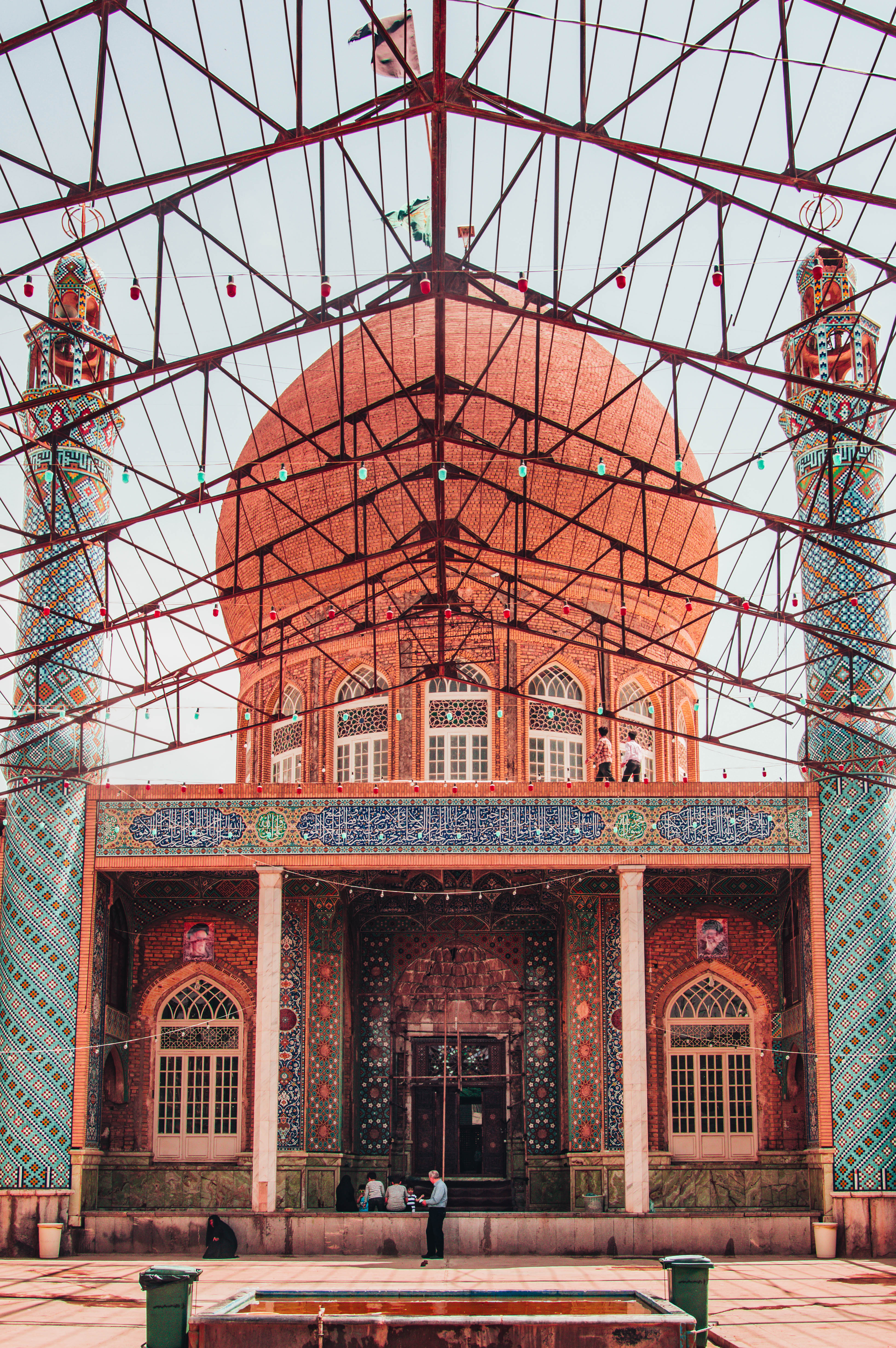
A view from the sahn, 2017

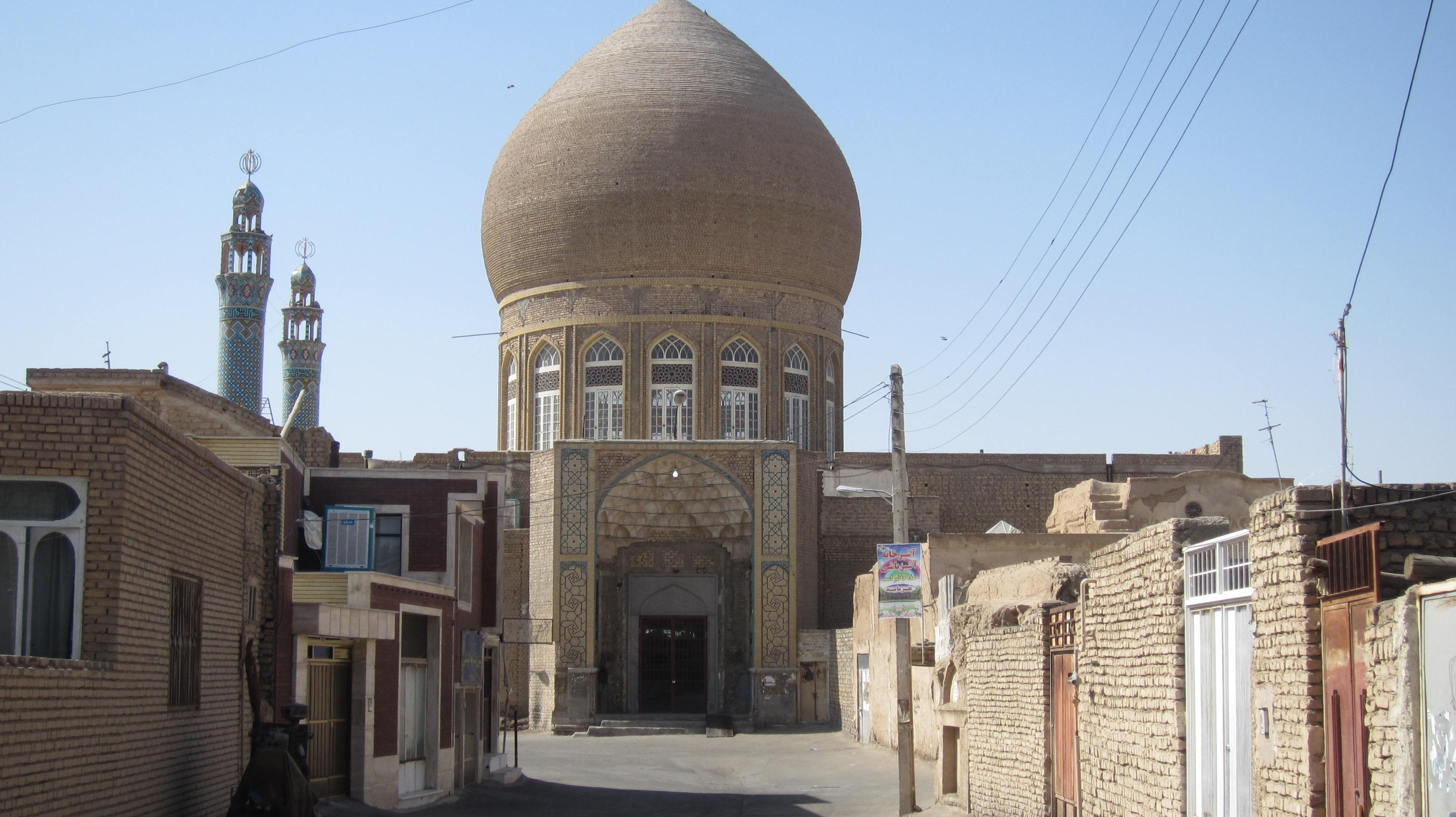
The Persian dome and two small minarets, 2013

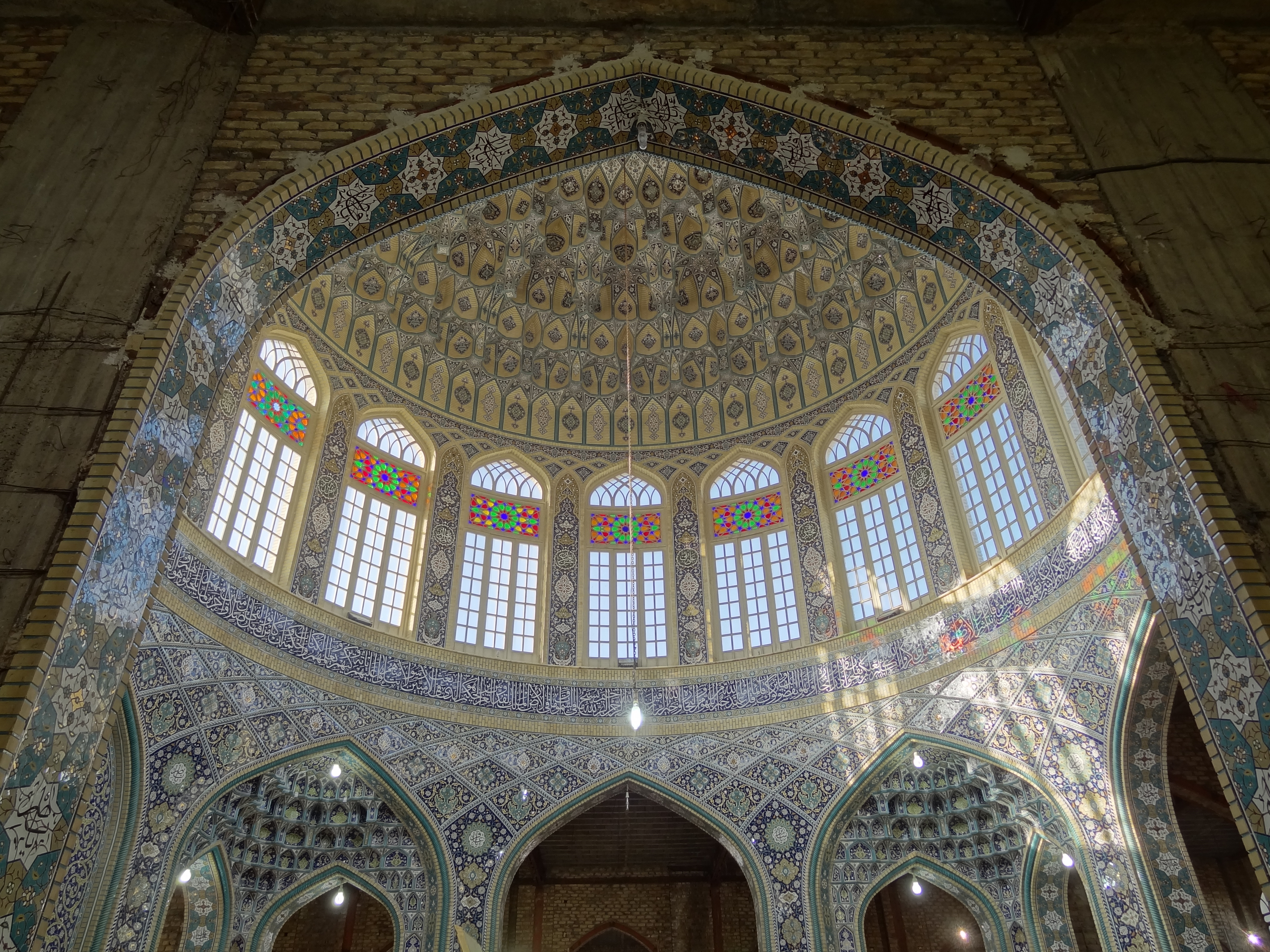
Interior of the dome, 2012

== See also ==
- List of imamzadehs in Iran
- List of mausoleums in Iran
- Persian domes
- Shia Islam in Iran
