= Ziyarat Amin Allah =

Zīyārat Amīn Allāh (Arabic: زیارة امین الله) is regarded as a piece of salutation which is a kind of Ziyarat text (visitation supplication), that is quoted from Imam Muhammad al-Baqir that it was recited by Ali ibn Hussain as the fourth Imam of Shia Islam when he visited the holy shrine of Imam Ali. This Ziyarat has been reported in reliable sources of Shia Islam, and is actually considered as a credible Ziyarat based on the text, content and likewise chain of transmission. Besides, Ziyarat Amin Allah is one of the general Ziyarats texts which can be recited near the shrines of Imams. Of note, it is regarded as the particular Ziyarat of Ali ibn Abi Talib to be recited on the Eid Al-Ghadeer.

== Etymology ==
In Islam, ziyārah (Arabic: زیارة) means turning and withdrawing from something, and is considered as visiting holy shrine of saint persons such as the Islamic Prophet Muhammad, Ali, Hussain and even visiting Imamzadeh and famous religious figures. On the other hand, the phrase of Amin Allah literally means "the trusty of Allah" or " trusted guardian, appointed by Allah", and separately the word "Amin" means a person who is trustyworth and honest, and in here this is exclusively related to the ziyarah text of Imam Ali.

== The importance ==
Ziyarat Amin Allah seems to have a high significance to the extent that for instance according to Imam al-Baqir as the fifth Imam of Shia Islam, whoever among Shia Muslims recites it (Ziyarat Amin Allah) by Ali ibn Abi Talib’s tomb or even when he/she is by the tomb of other (Shia) Imams, the (most high) God carries the Ziyarat and supplication to Jannah (paradise) in a letter of light, and in fact it will be signed by the Islamic Prophet Muhammad’s seal, and this is going to be kept until the occasion this is delivered to the promised Mahdi who is regarded as the descendants of Muhammad and subsequently he will welcome the owner of that by good news, salutation and generosity.

== Some phrases of the Ziyarat ==
"Peace be on you, O trusted guardian, appointed by Allah, to administer His earth, and to convince the mankind to accept His plan. Peace be on you, O Ameer ul Moomineen; I testify that you made utmost efforts, as it should be, in the cause of Allah, acted upon His Book, followed the way of life of His Prophet, (blessings of Allah be on him and on his children), to the last moment of your life, until Allah invited you to come unto Him, and used His discretion to take you away, and sealed your enemies' doom with the blame that the arguments had been made known to one and all through you."
