= Imamzadeh Davood =

Shi'ite shrine in Tehran, Iran

- امامزاده داوود
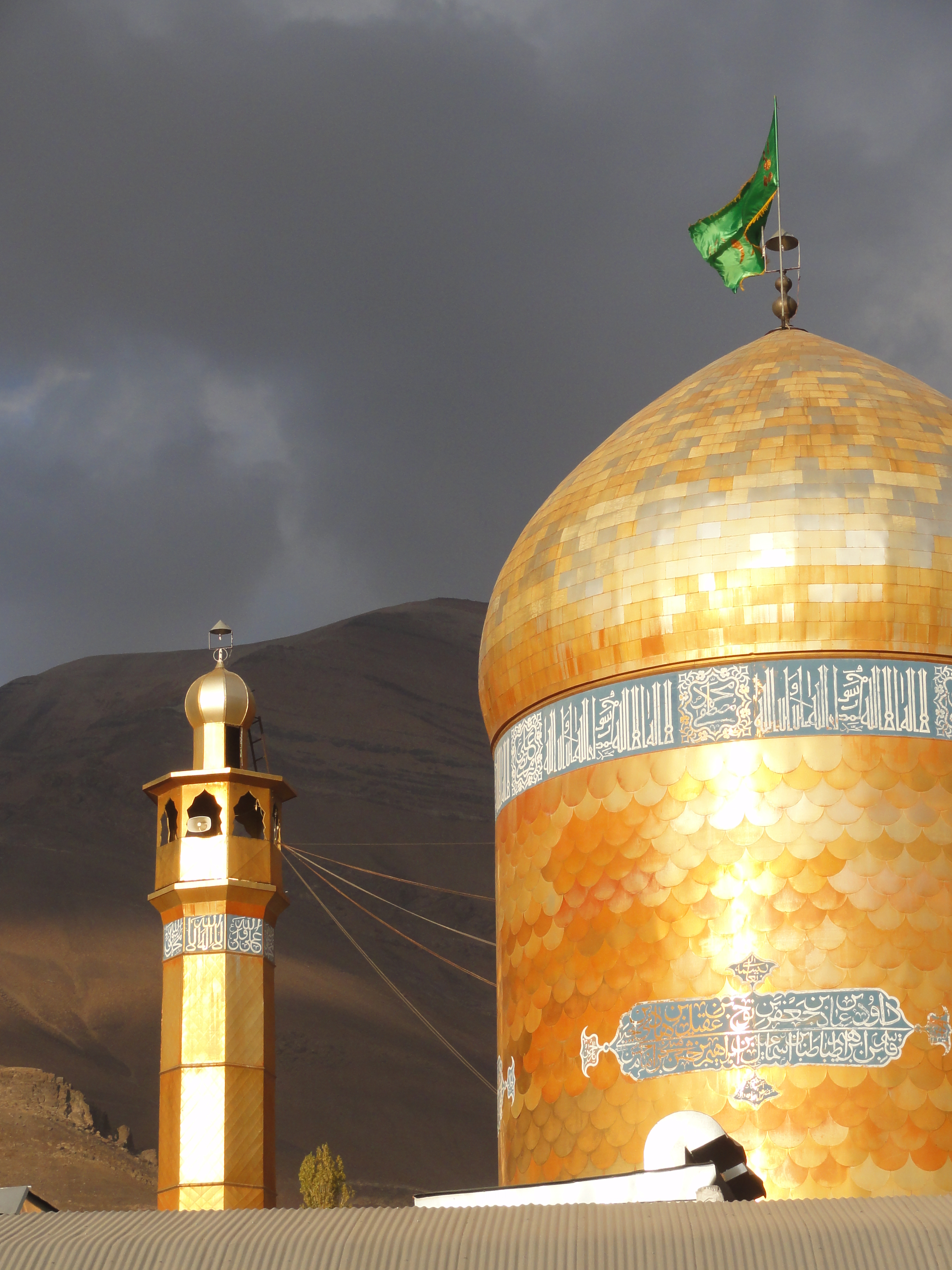
- The dome and minaret, in 2013

- Location of the complex in Iran

Religion
- Affiliation: Shia Islam
- Ecclesiastical or organisational status: Imamzadeh and mausoleum

Location
- Location: Tehran, Tehran province
- Interactive map of Imamzadeh Davood
- Coordinates: 35°52′37″N 51°20′16″E

Architecture
- Type: Islamic architecture
- Style: Safavid; Qajar
- Completed: 16th century CE (prime); 1832 CE

Specifications
- Dome: One
- Minaret: One
- Materials: Stone; bricks; metal, aina-kari

The Imamzadeh Davood (Persian: امامزاده داوود; Arabic: مرقد داود) is a Shia imamzadeh and mausoleum complex, located in Tehran, Iran. The funerary complex was completed in the 16th century CE, during the Safavid Empire, with renovations completed by 1832 CE, during the Qajar era.

The road to Imamzadeh Davood starts at the Haryas waterfall in Kan district and after traveling a distance of 25 kilometers, reaches Imamzadeh Davood. It contains the tomb of Davood ibn Musa, a son of the seventh Shia Imam, Musa al-Kazim. It is a holy site in Shia Islam.

== Gallery ==
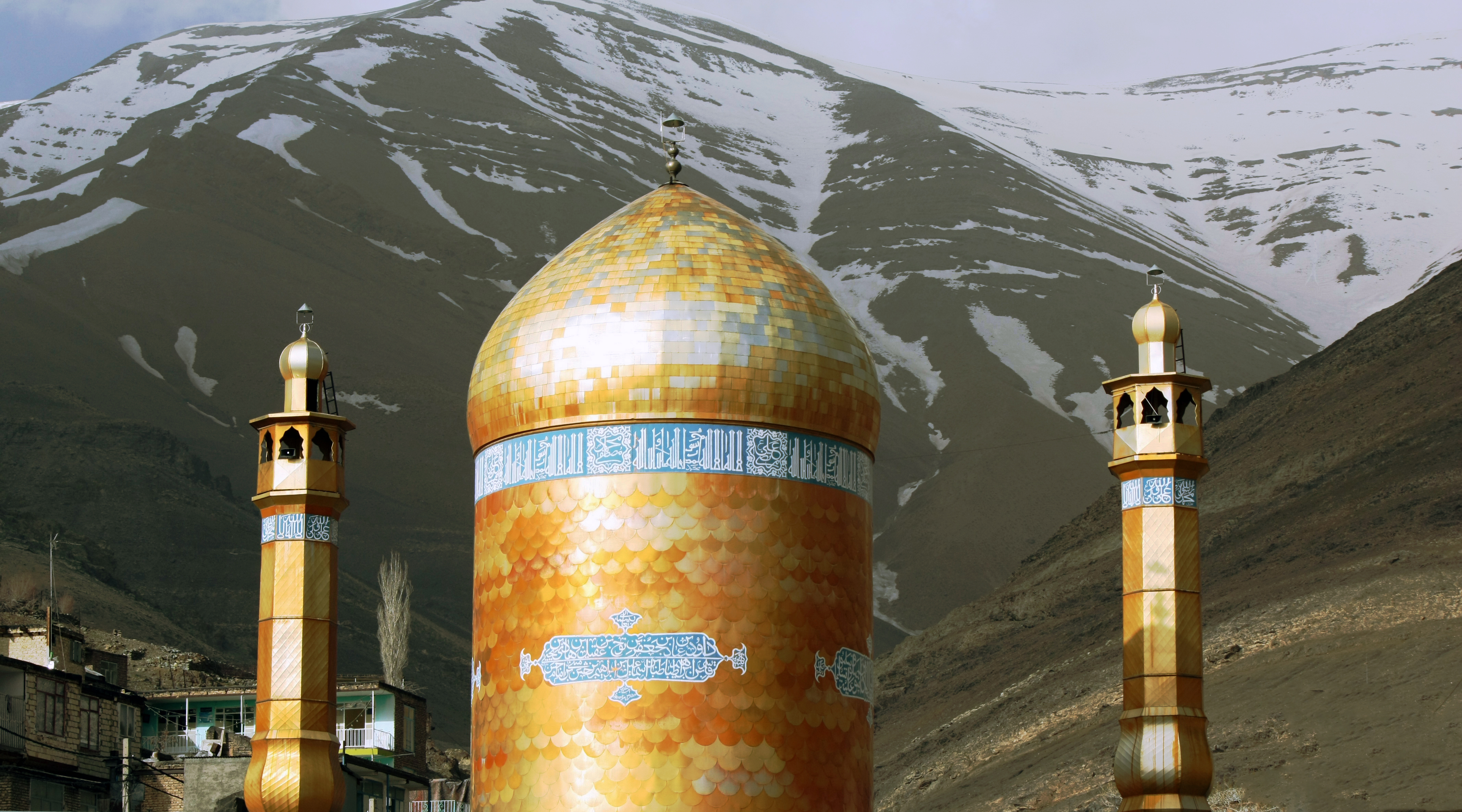

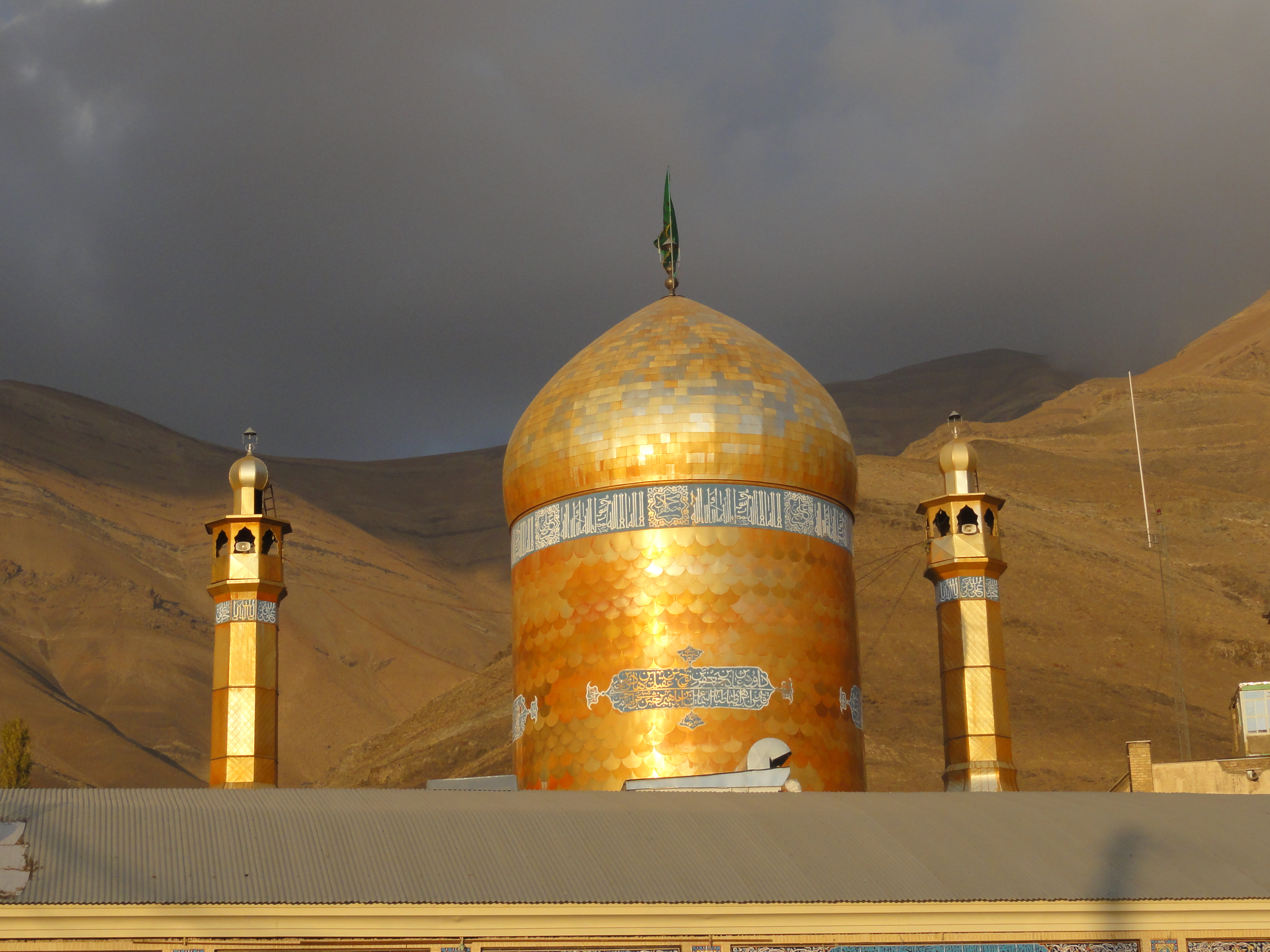

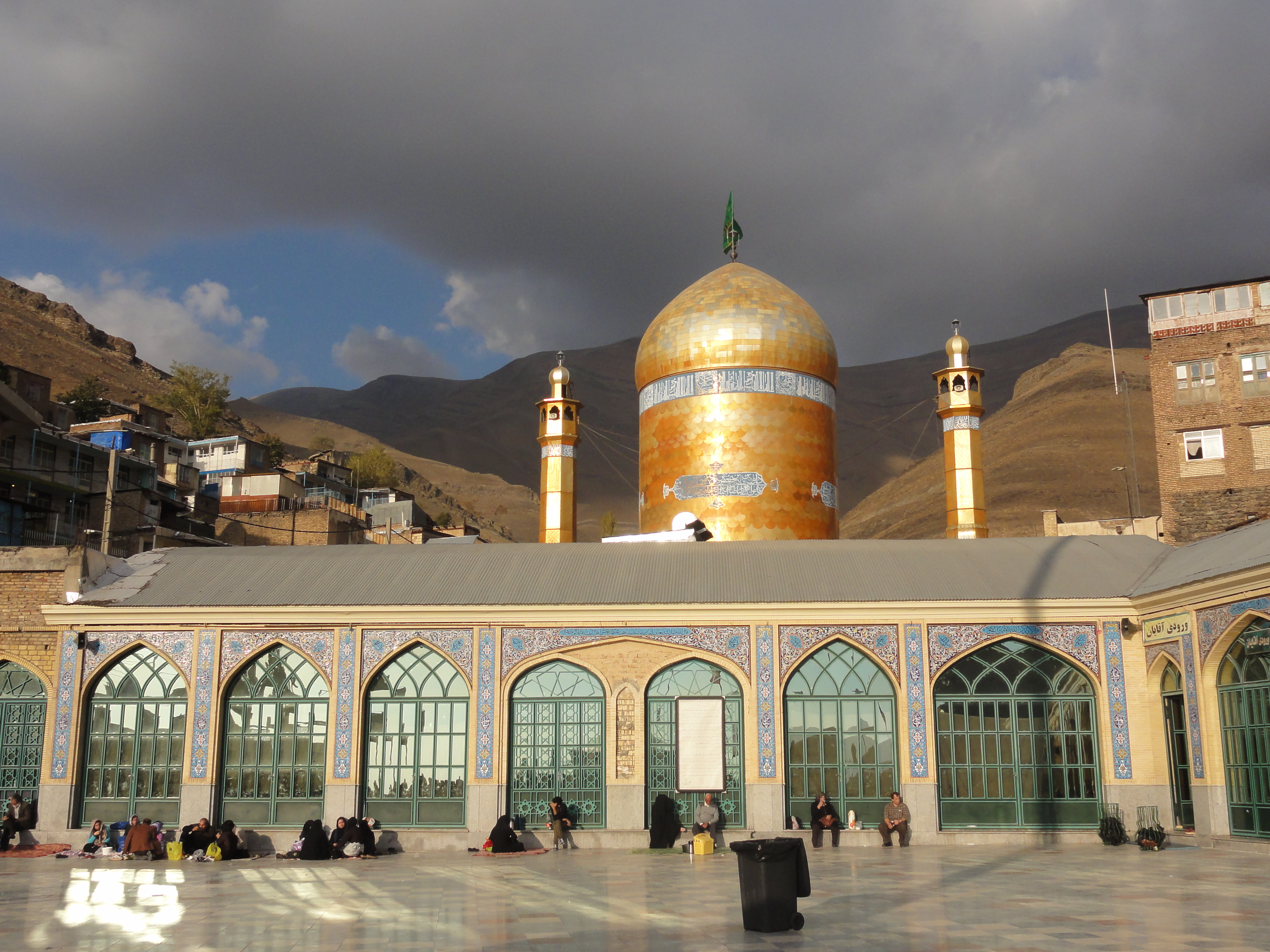

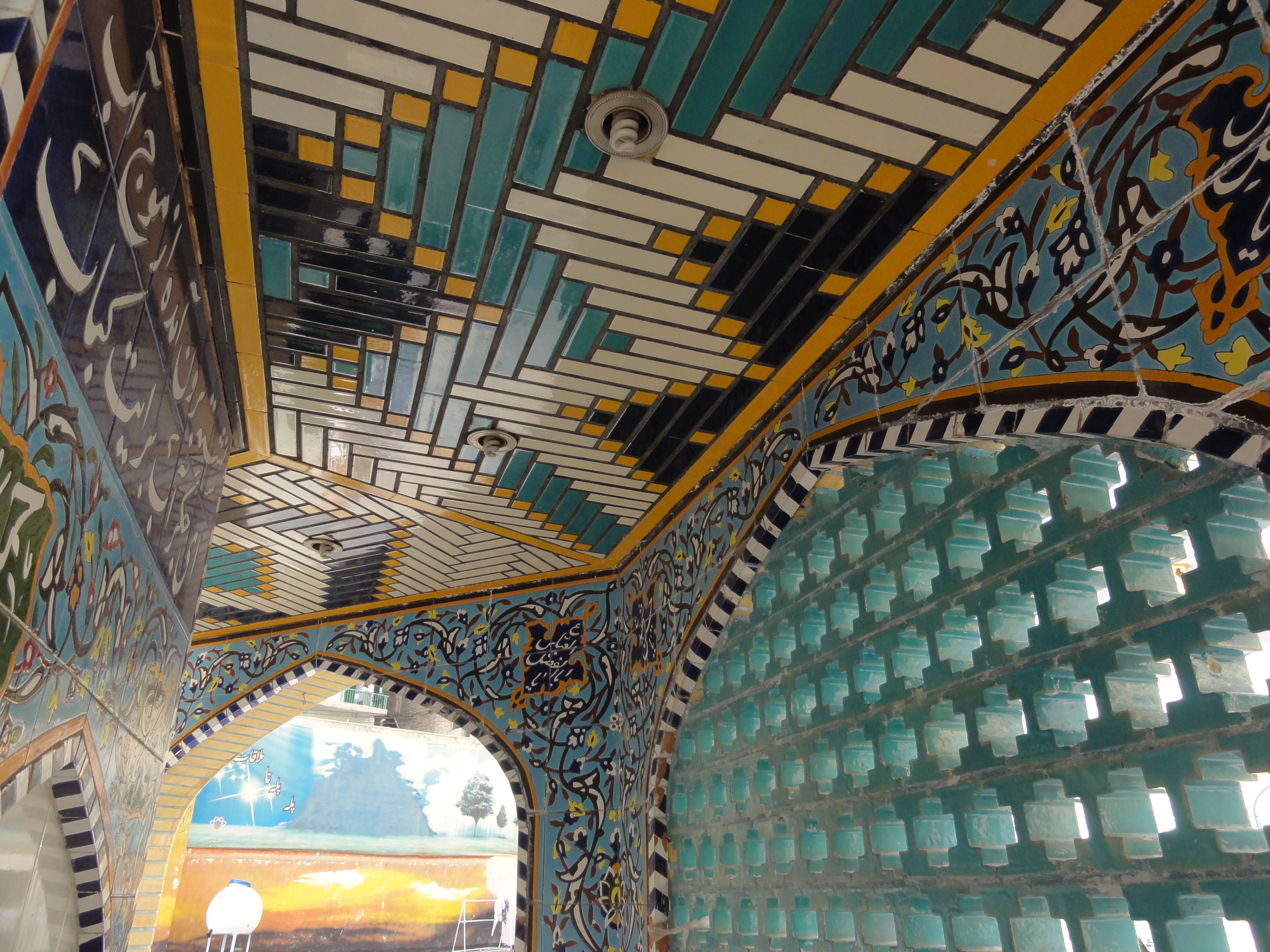

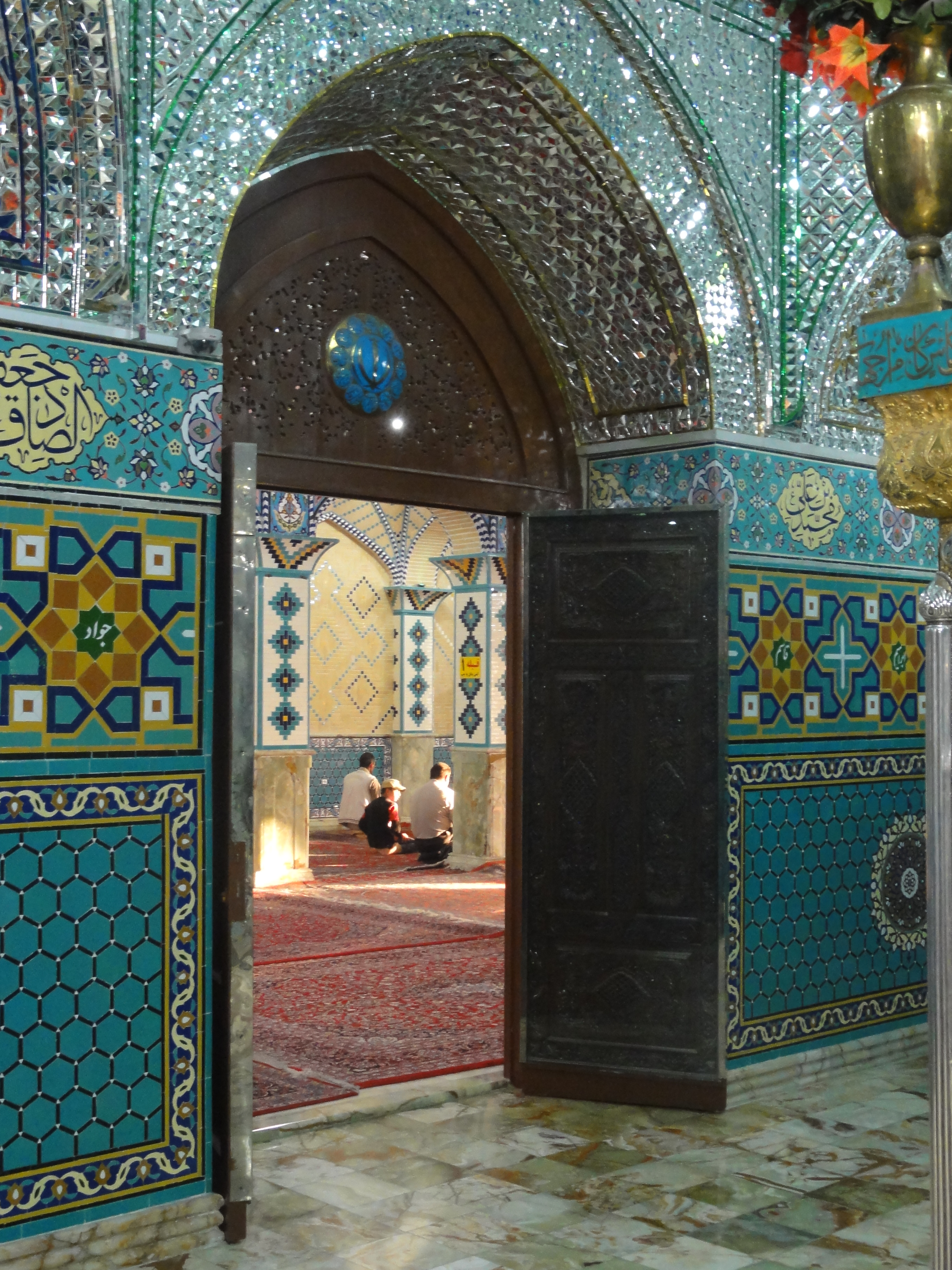

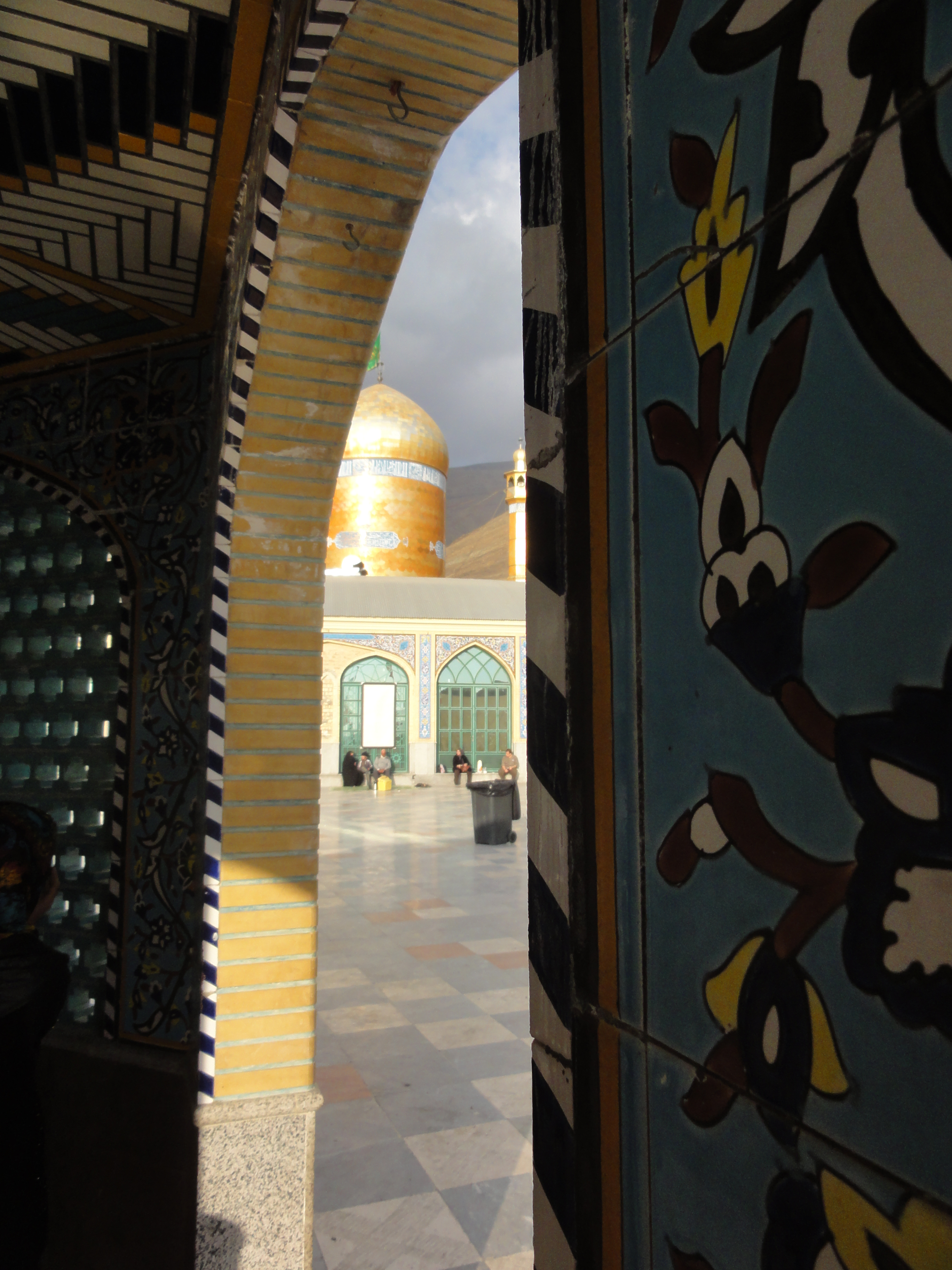

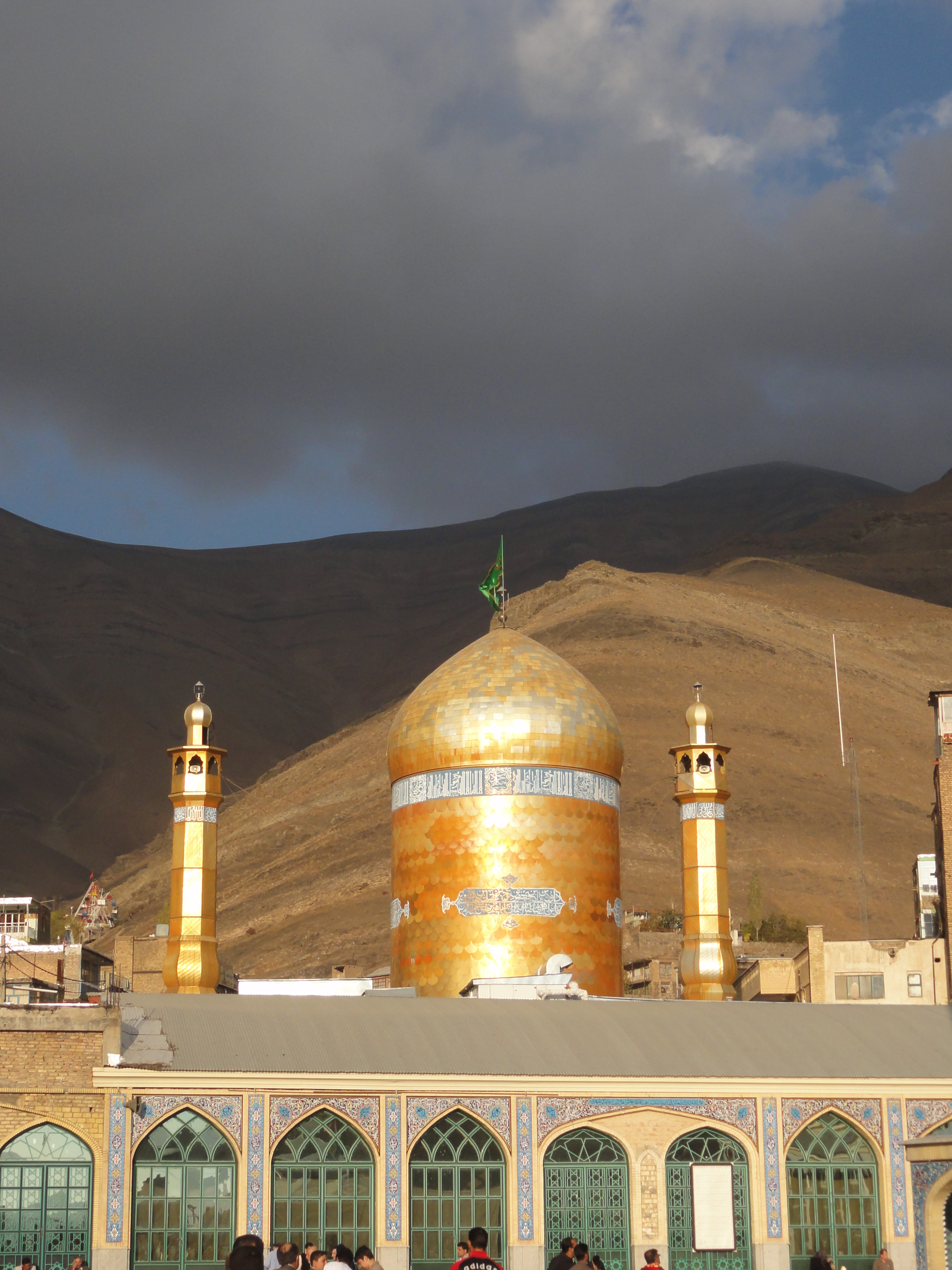

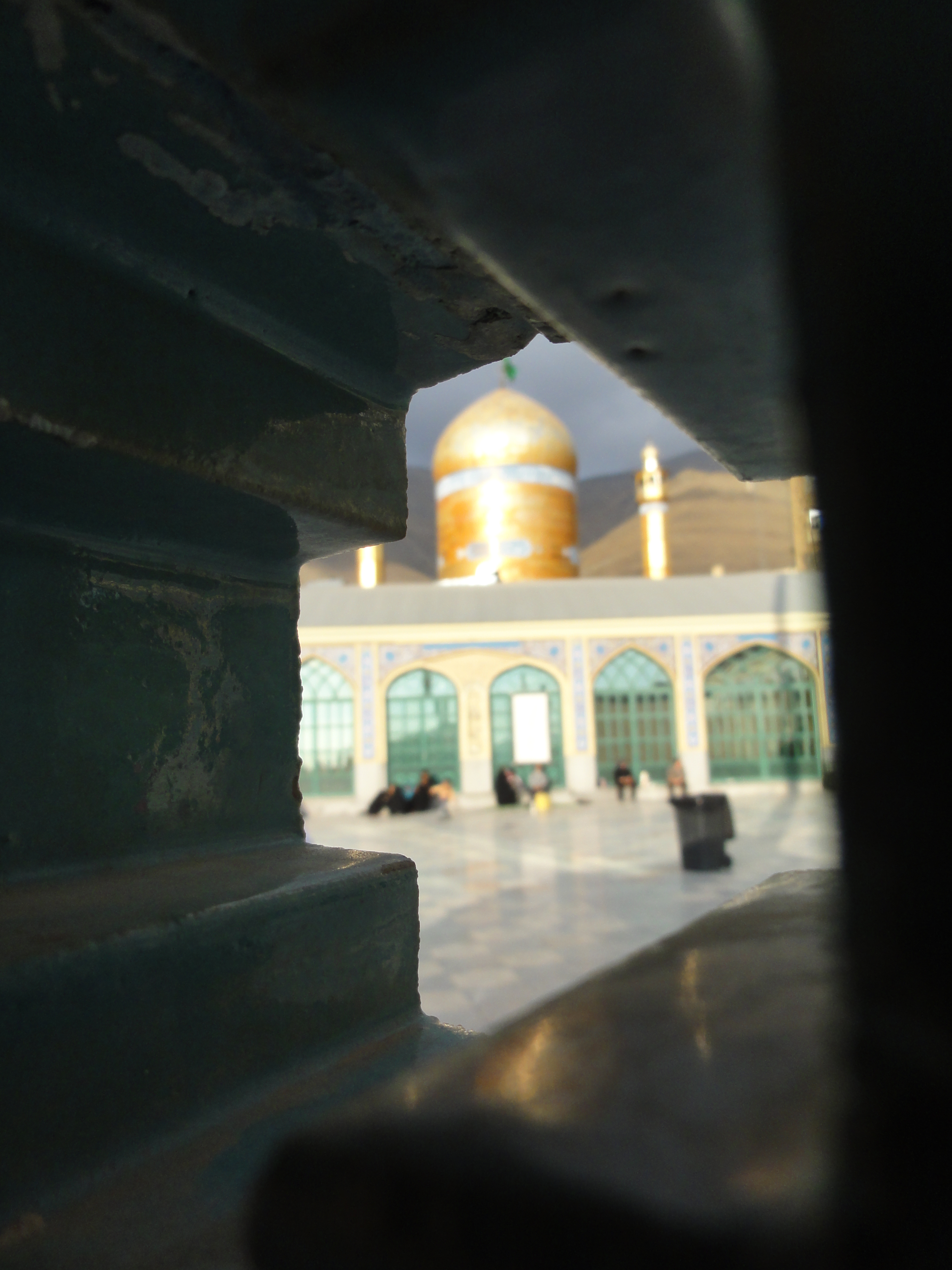

== See also ==
- List of imamzadehs in Iran
- List of mausoleums in Iran
- Shia Islam in Iran
