= Imamzadeh Hadi =

Shi'ite shrine and mosque in Ray, Iran

- امامزاده هادی
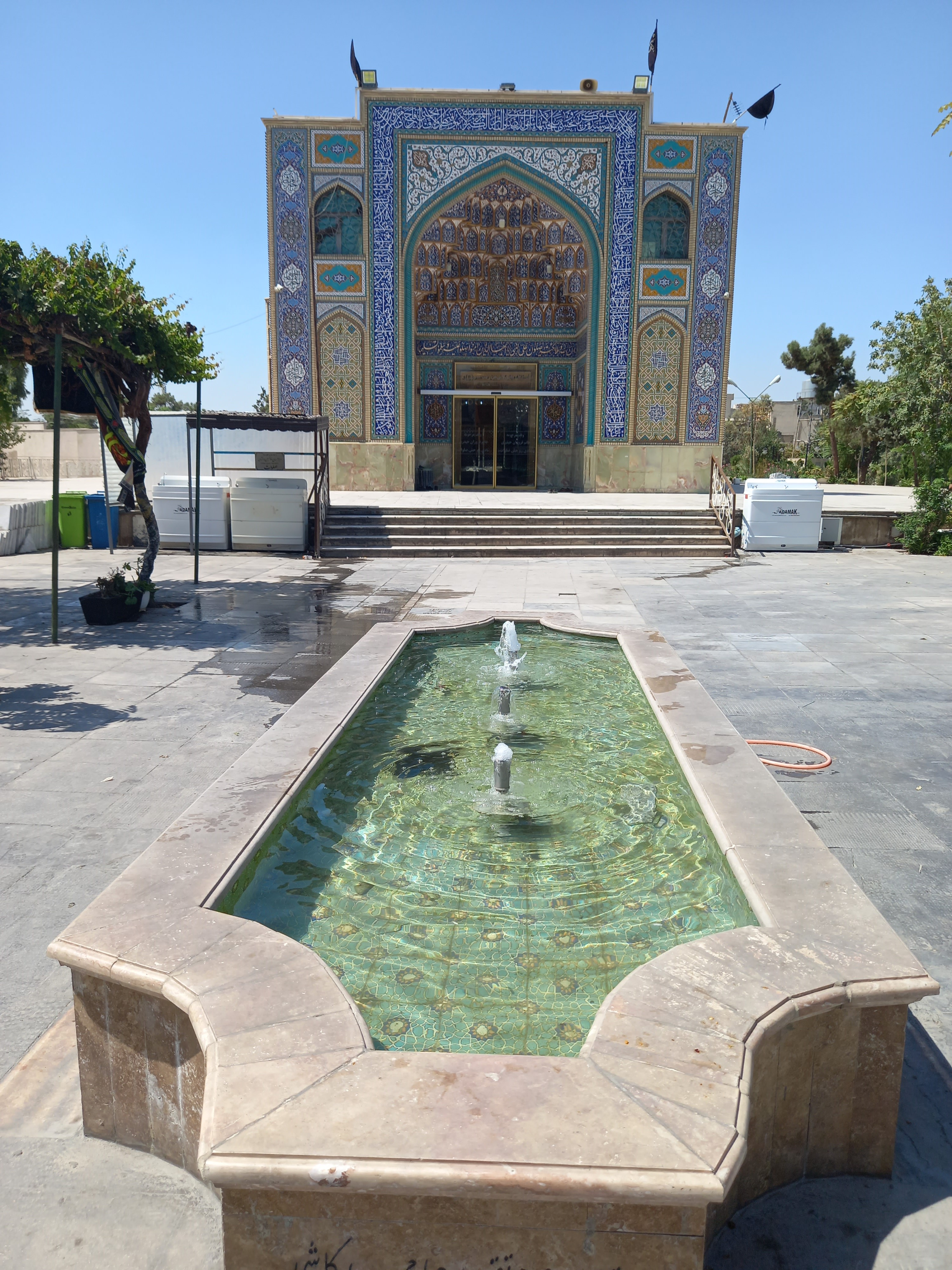

- Location of the imamzadeh in Iran

Religion
- Affiliation: Shia Islam
- Ecclesiastical or organizational status: Imamzadeh and mausoleum
- Status: Active

Location
- Location: Ibn Babawayh Cemetery, Ray, Tehran Province
- Country: Iran
- Interactive map of Imamzadeh Hadi
- Coordinates: 35°36′13″N 51°26′43″E

Architecture
- Type: Islamic architecture
- Style: Safavid; Qajar
- Founder: Tahmasp I
- Established: 16th century; 1869 (renovations)

Specifications
- Interior area: 36 m^{2} (390 sq ft)
- Dome: One
- Materials: Bricks; mortar; tiles

The Imamzadeh Hadi (Persian: امامزاده هادی; Arabic: مرقد هادي الكاظم) is a Shi'ite imamzadeh and mausoleum complex, part of the Ibn Babawayh Cemetery, located in Ray, in the province of Tehran, Iran. Founded by Tahmasp I, the complex was completed in the 16th century CE, during the Safavid era, and renovations were completed in 1869 CE, during the Qajar era.

== See also ==
- List of imamzadehs in Iran
- List of mausoleums in Iran
- Shia Islam in Iran
