= Imamzadeh Seyed Mohammad =

Shi'ite shrine, located in Tabiz, East Azerbaijan, Iran

- امامزاده سید محمد (اصفهان)
- The shrine at night, in 2017

- Location of the shrine in Iran

Religion
- Affiliation: Islam
- Branch/tradition: Shia (Twelver)
- Ecclesiastical or organisational status: Imamzadeh; Mosque
- Status: Active

Location
- Location: Khomeyni Shahr County, Isfahan Province, Iran
- Country: Iran
- Interactive map of Imamzadeh Seyed Mohammad
- Coordinates: 32°43′28″N 51°32′52″E

Architecture
- Type: Islamic architecture
- Style: Ilkhanate; Safavid; Qajar

Iran National Heritage List
- Official name: Imamzadeh Muhammad
- Type: Built
- Designated: 24 June 1970
- Reference no.: 896
- Conservation organization: Cultural Heritage, Handicrafts and Tourism Organization of Iran

The Imamzadeh Seyed Mohammad, also known as the Imamzadeh Muhammad (Isfahan) (Persian: امامزاده سید محمد (اصفهان); Arabic: امامزاده سید محمد (اصفهان)), is a Twelver Shia imamzadeh and mosque, located in Khomeyni Shahr County, in the province of Isfahan, Iran.

The shrine was completed during the Ilkhanate era. It contains the tomb of Seyed Mohammad, a son of the 4th Imam Zayd ibn Ali. The complex was added to the Iran National Heritage List on 24 June 1970, administered by the Cultural Heritage, Handicrafts and Tourism Organization of Iran. The shrine a holy site in Shia Islam.

== See also ==
- Shia Islam in Iran
- List of mosques in Iran
- List of imamzadehs in Iran
