= Imamzadeh Sayyid Muhammad Kojajani =

Iranian shrine and mosque

Religion
- Affiliation: Shia (Twelver)
- Ecclesiastical or organisational status: Imamzadeh; Mosque
- Status: Active

Location
- Location: Tabrīz, East Azerbaijan
- Country: Iran

Architecture
- Type: Mosque architecture
- Shrine: One (Sayyid Muhammad)

The Imamzadeh Sayyid Muhammad Kojajani is a Twelver Shia Imamzadeh and mosque complex in Kojajan of Tabriz, in the province of East Azerbaijan, Iran. The mosque contains the grave of Shams al-Din, a descendant of Imām, Zayn al-‘Ābidīn. It is a holy site in Shia Islam.

== See also ==
- Shia Islam in Iran
- List of mosques in Iran
- List of imamzadehs in Iran
