= Imamzadeh Ismail and Shayah Mosque =

Historic Seljuk mosque and Safavid shrine in Iran

- امامزاده اسماعیل و مسجد شعیا
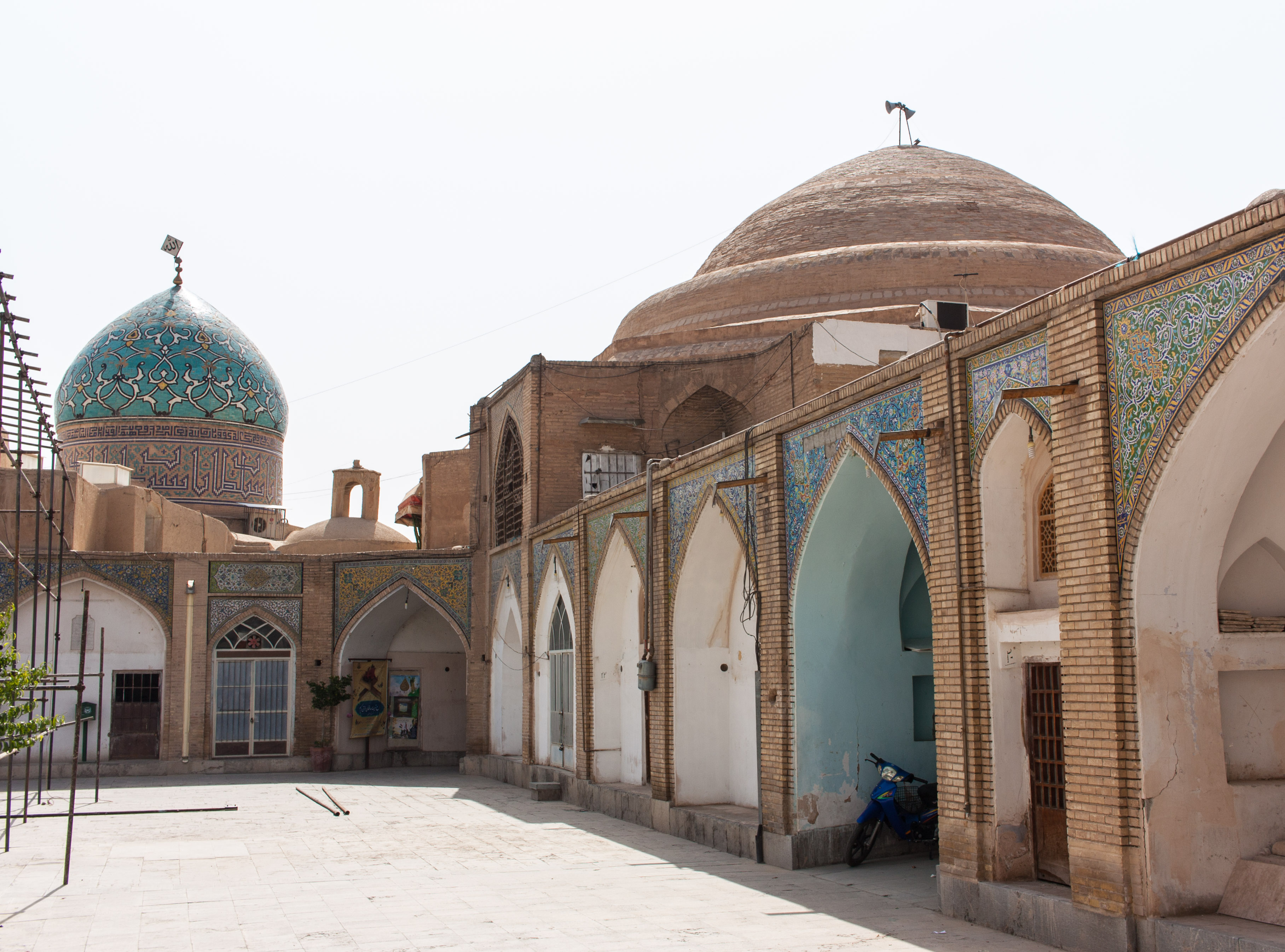
- An overview of the religious complex, viewed from its sahn

- Location of the religious complex in Iran

Religion
- Affiliation: Shia (Twelver)
- Ecclesiastical or organisational status: Imamzadeh, mausoleum, and mosque

Location
- Location: Esfahan, Isfahan province
- Country: Iran
- Interactive map of Imamzadeh Ismail and Shayah Mosque
- Coordinates: 32°39′47″N 51°41′09″E

Architecture
- Type: Islamic architecture
- Style: Seljuk; Safavid
- Completed: 11th century CE (mosque); 1632 CE (imamzadeh)

Specifications
- Dome: Two
- Minarets: One (mosque; ruined)
- Minaret height: 12 m (39 ft)
- Shrines: Two: Ismail; Isaiah (purportedly)
- Materials: Bricks; tiles; timber; gold; steel; plaster

Iran National Heritage List
- Official name: Emamzadeh Ismail and Isaiah Mosque
- Type: Mausoleum/Emamzadeh
- Designated: 1932
- Reference no.: 112
- Conservation organization: Cultural Heritage, Handicrafts and Tourism Organization of Iran

The Imamzadeh Ismail and Shayah Mosque (Persian: امامزاده اسماعیل و مسجد شعیا) is a Twelver Shia imamzadeh, mausoleum, and mosque complex, located in Esfahan, in the province of Isfahan, Iran, which dates from both the Seljuk and Safavid periods. The complex was added to the Iran National Heritage List on 6 January 1932, administered by the Cultural Heritage, Handicrafts and Tourism Organization of Iran.

The original structure was a pre-Islamic building that was converted into a mosque during the Muslim conquest of Persia. During the Seljuk period, the mosque became known as Shayah Mosque. After the Safavids had taken over Persia, they added a sahn to the structure, and built the imamzadeh.

== Structures ==
=== Imamzadeh ===
The Imamzadeh Ismail (Persian: امامزاده اسماعيل) was built around the tomb of Ismail, a grandson of the third Ahlulbayt Imam, Hasan ibn Ali. Construction started in the Safavid era during the rule of Shah Abbas I, and it was completed in 1632 CE, during the rule of Safi of Persia. The dome of the imamzadeh is decorated with tiles, and underneath the dome is Ismail's grave. The entrance of the imamzadeh has two gilded wooden doors with very thin lines of gold on a steel background. A hallway within the imamzadeh holds many paintings by Mohammad Saleh Esfahani.

=== Mosque ===
The Shayah Mosque (Persian: مسجد شیعه), also known as the Shayah-Nabi Tomb (Persian: مقبره شیاح نبی), is the older part of the religious complex. It dates from the Seljuk period in the 11th century, and was originally built over a smaller mosque that dated from the Rashidun period. The mosque is believed to contain the tomb of Isaiah, who is revered in Islamic tradition as a Prophet and the advisor of Hezekiah. The mosque's brick minaret dates back to the Seljuk era as well, and it is 12 metres tall, but it is ruined.

== Gallery ==
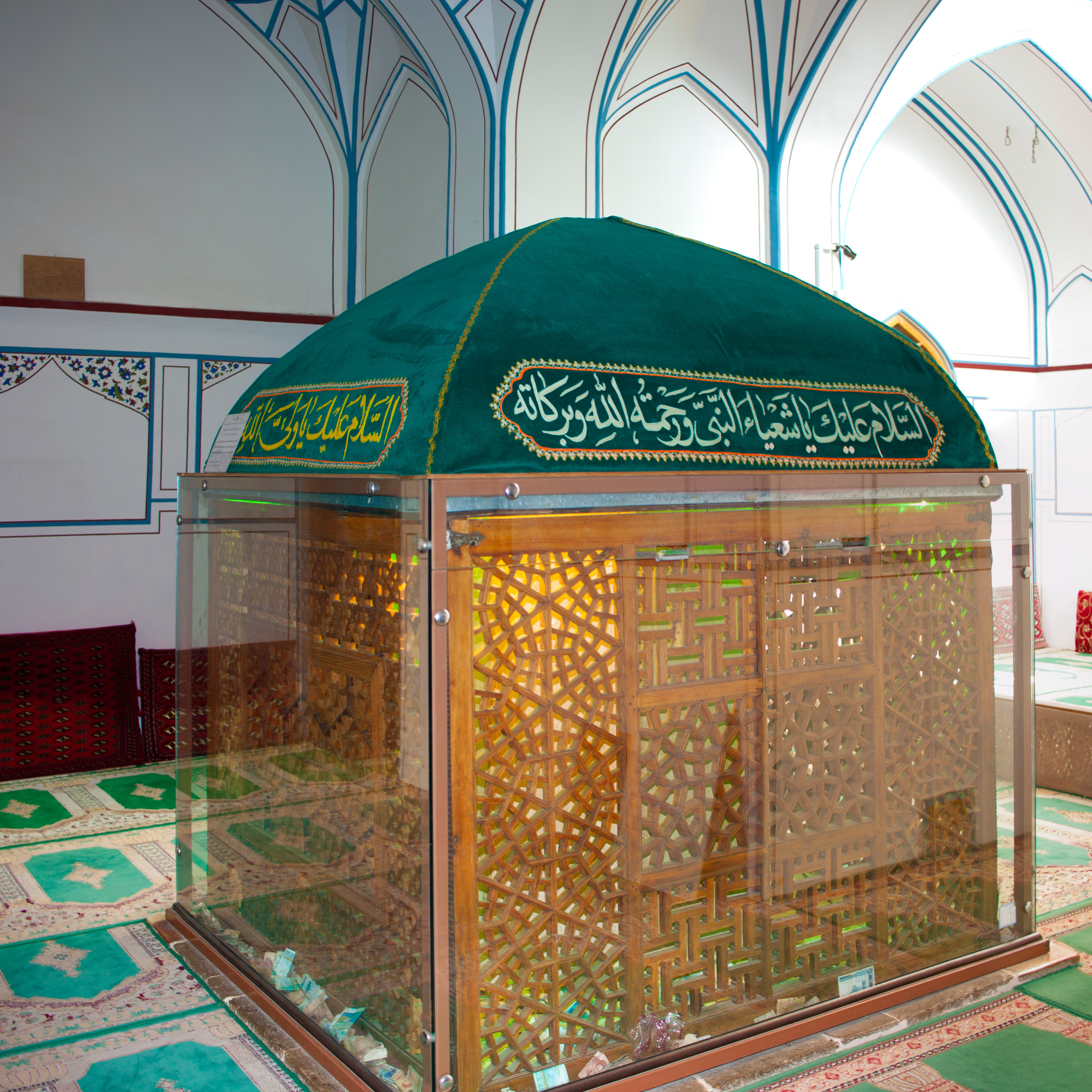
The purported tomb of Isaiah

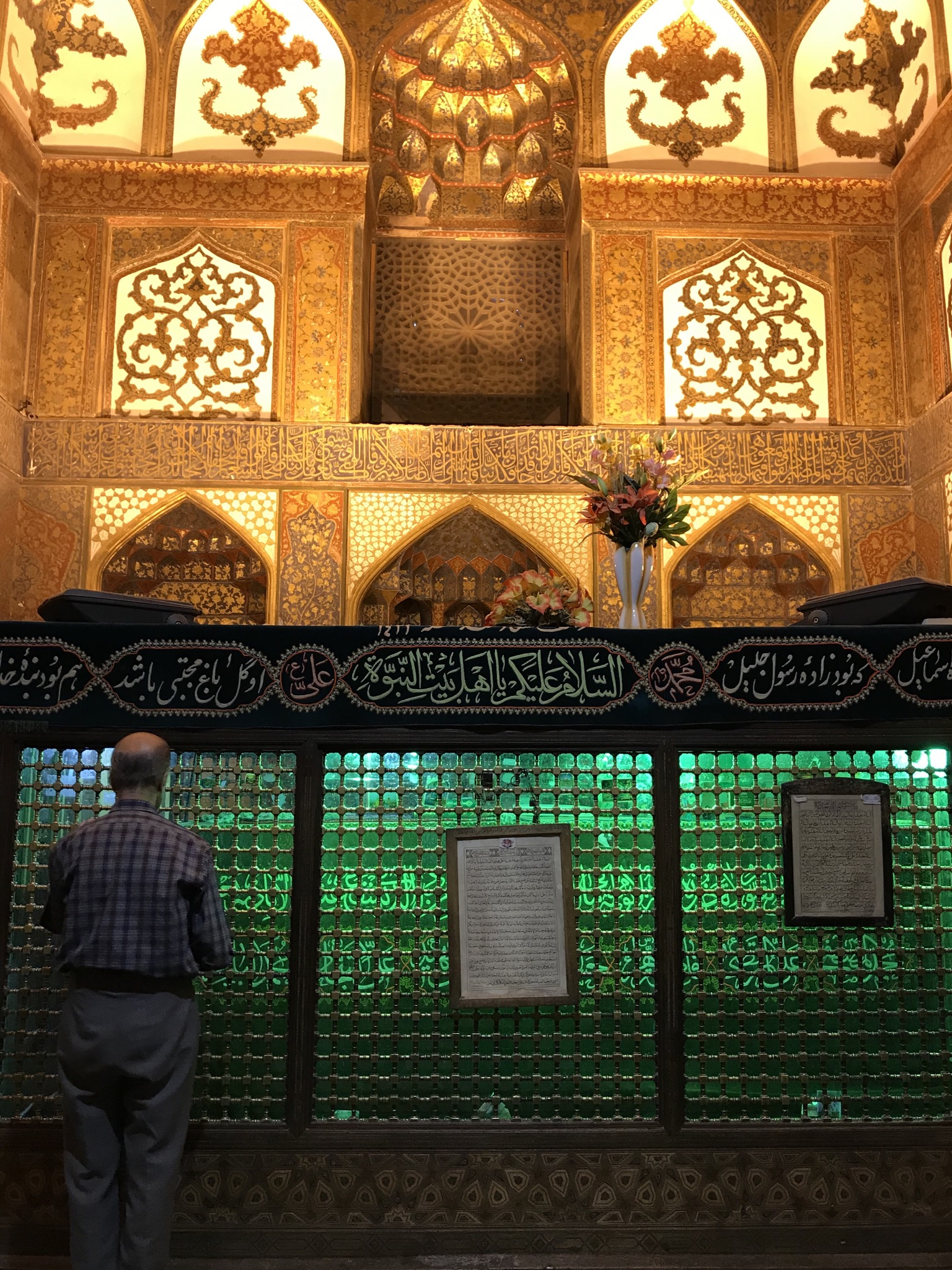
A devotee at the grave, praying to Ismail

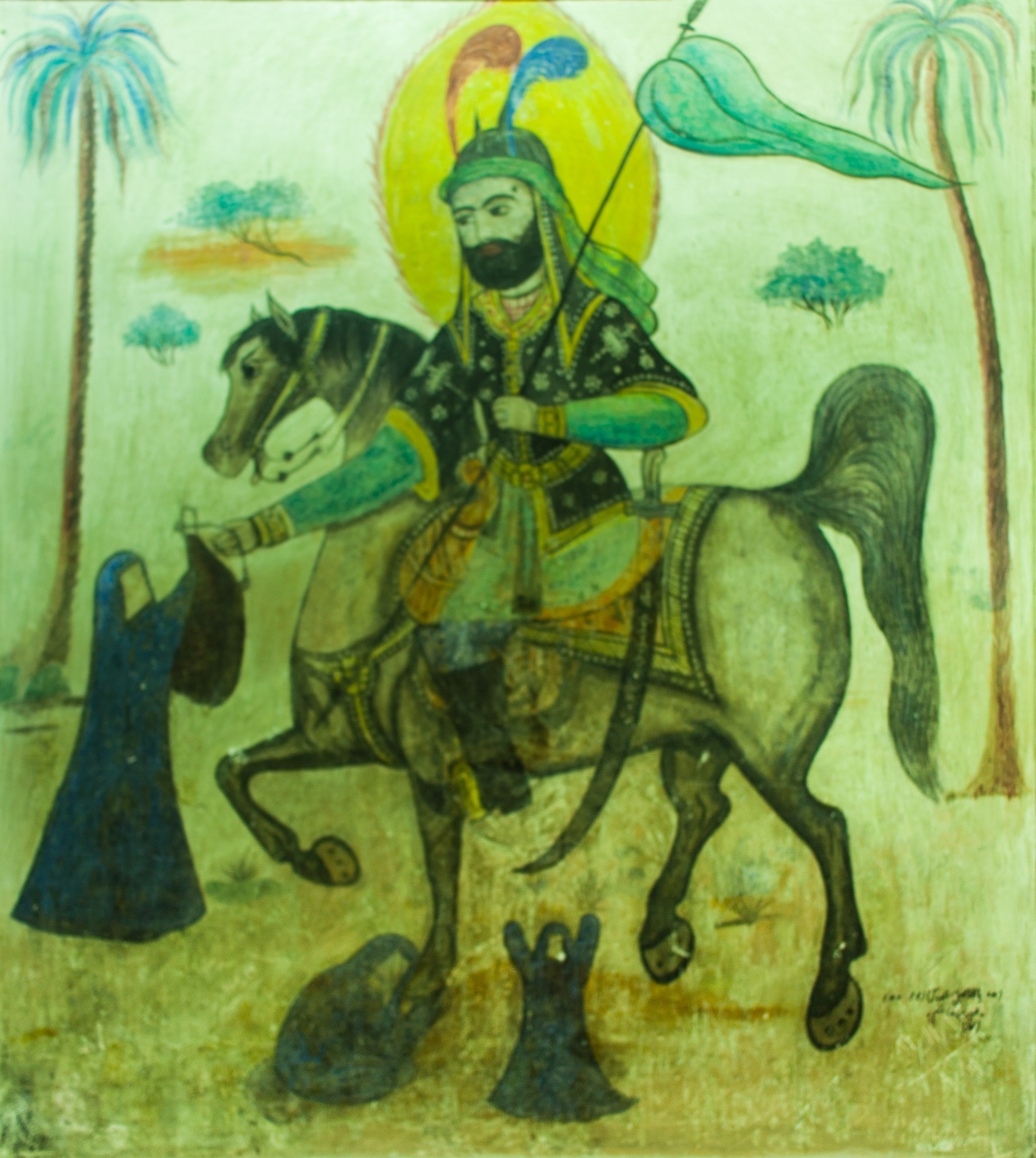
A painting in the imamzadeh

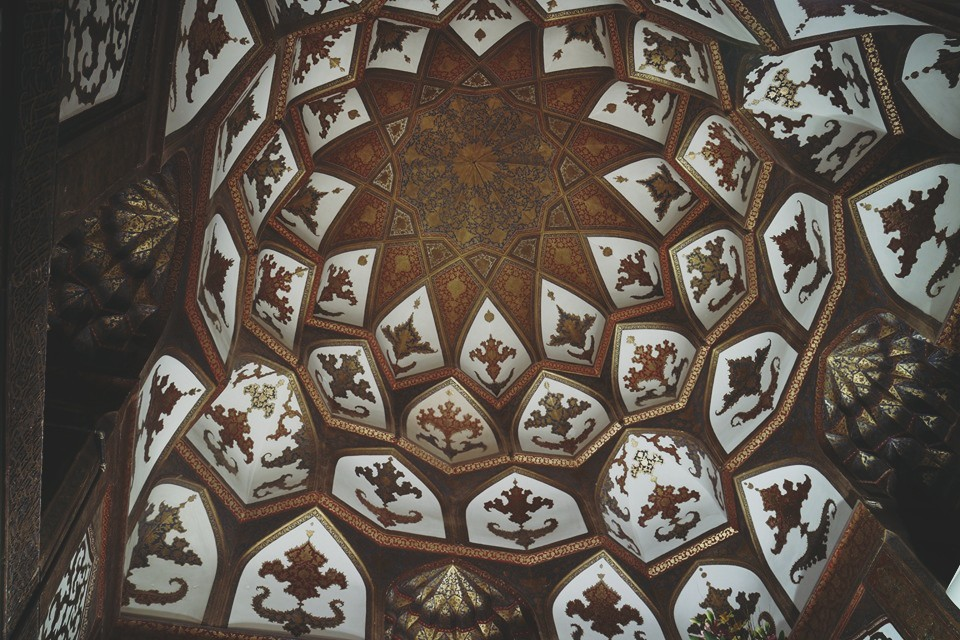
The muqarnas underneath the dome of the imamzadeh

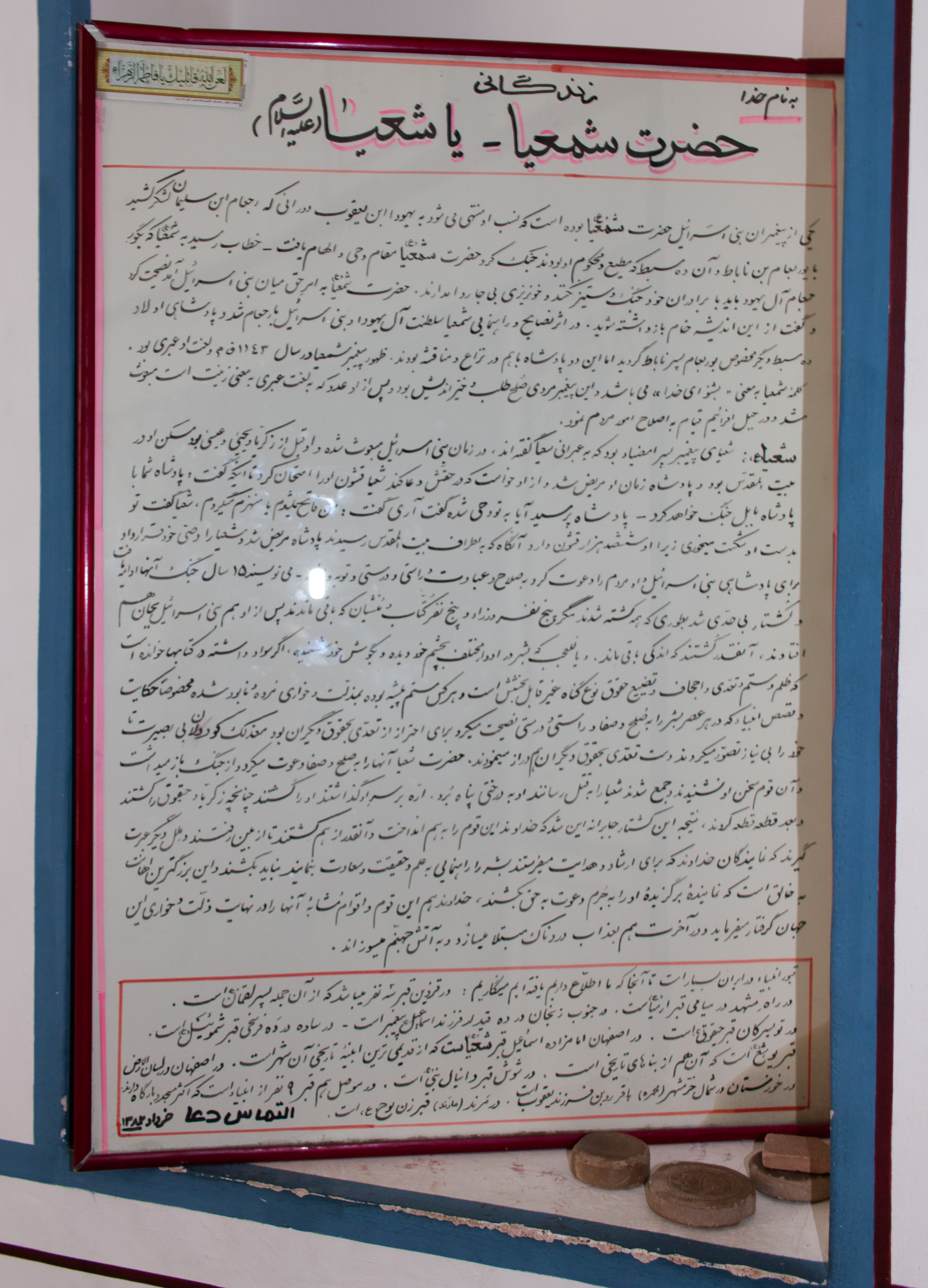
A sign board at the Shayah Mosque, displaying the Islamic story of Isaiah and a mention of many other tombs dedicated to him throughout Iran

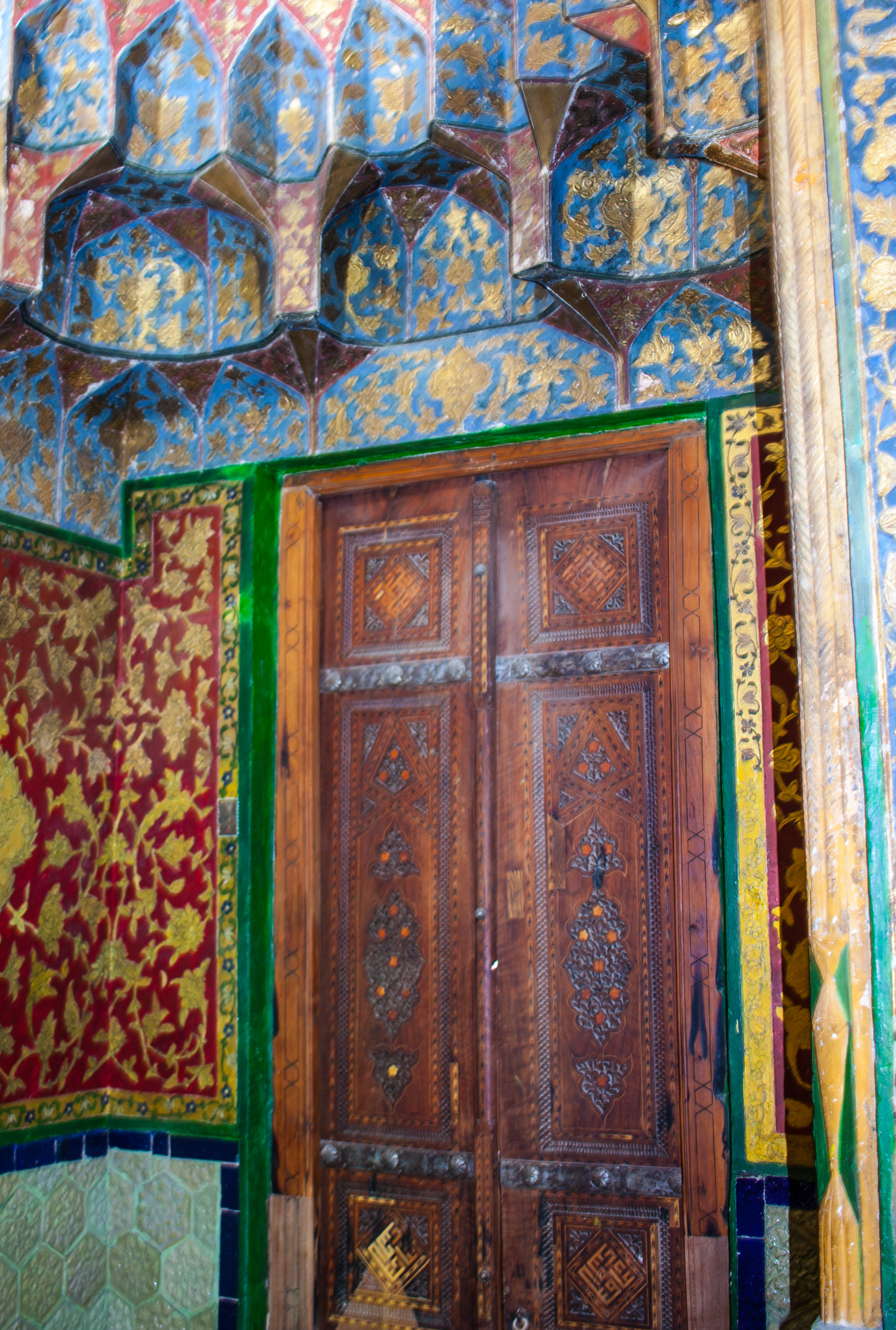
One of the doors in the religious complex, with muqarnas style above the doorway

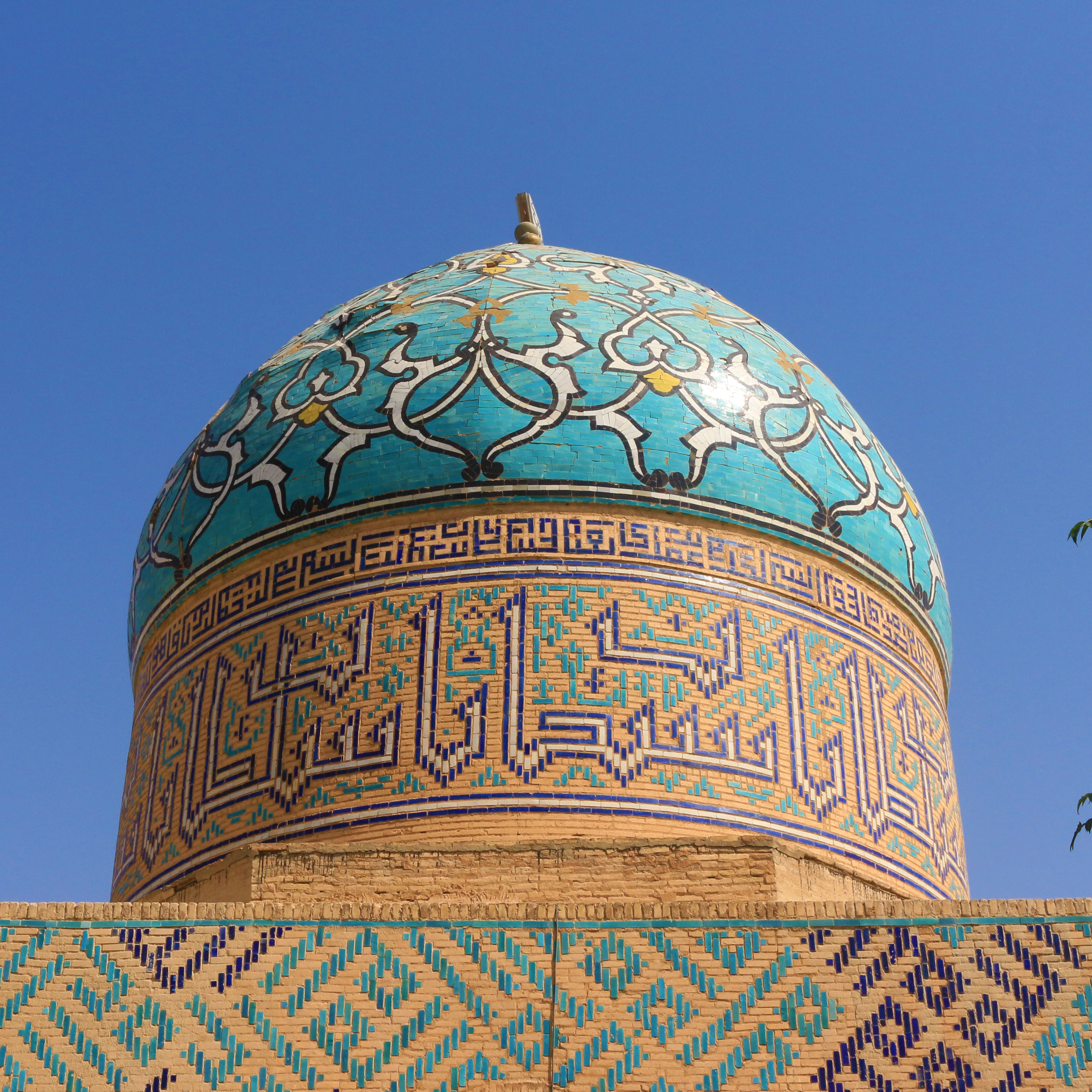
The imamzadeh dome

== See also ==
- List of imamzadehs in Iran
- List of mosques in Iran
- List of mausoleums in Iran
- Shia Islam in Iran
