= Imamzadeh Shah Zeyd =

- Location within Iran

Religion
- Affiliation: Shia Islam
- Province: Isfahan

Location
- Location: Isfahan, Iran
- Municipality: Isfahan
- Coordinates: 32.651389°N 51.701667°E

Architecture
- Type: Imamzadeh
- Style: Isfahani
- Designated as NHL

Iran National Heritage List
- Official name: Emamzadeh Shah Zeyd
- Type: Emamzadeh
- Designated: 1937
- Reference no.: 294
- Conservation organization: Cultural Heritage, Handicrafts and Tourism Organization of Iran

Imamzadeh Shah Zeyd (Persian: امامزاده شاه زید) is an imamzadeh in Isfahan, Iran. It belongs to the early Safavid era. It is well known for paintings on its walls. These paintings are about the Battle of Karbala. Cavalries are in most of the paintings, but there are also other elements such as veiled women, dead bodies, birds, mosques and even flowers and nightingales. The painter of the artworks is Abbas Shahzadeh. He has tried to use the available space as much as he can.
