= Shohada Mosque =

Mosque in Tabriz, Iran

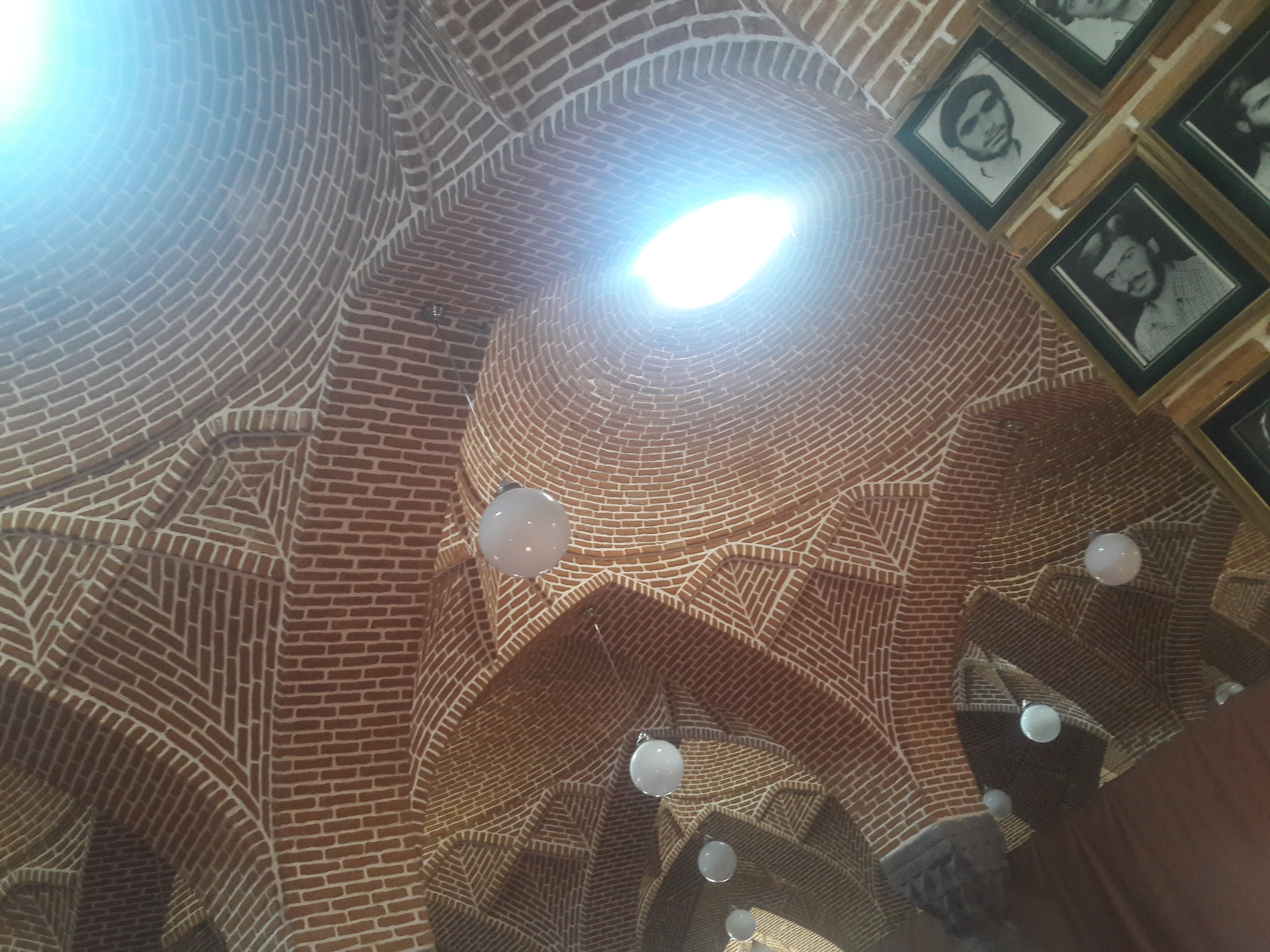
- The mosque interior, in 2017

- Location of the mosque in Iran

Religion
- Affiliation: Shia Islam
- Ecclesiastical or organizational status: Mosque
- Status: Active

Location
- Location: Tabriz, East Azerbaijan
- Country: Iran
- Interactive map of Shohada Mosque
- Coordinates: 38°04′39″N 46°17′44″E

Architecture
- Type: Mosque architecture
- Style: Qajar
- Completed: Qajar era

Specifications
- Dome: One (maybe more)
- Materials: Bricks

Iran National Heritage List
- Official name: Shohada Mosque
- Type: Built
- Designated: 5 May 1997
- Reference no.: 1861
- Conservation organization: Cultural Heritage, Handicrafts and Tourism Organization of Iran

The Shohada Mosque (Arabic: مسجد الشهداء; Persian: مسجد شهدا) is a Shi'ite mosque, located in Shohada Square, in the city center of Tabriz, in the province of East Azerbaijan, Iran. The mosque was built during the Qajar era and is dedicated to the martyrs of Islam.

The mosque draws in name from a Persian word, shohada, meaning martyr.

The mosque was added to the Iran National Heritage List on 5 May 1997, administered by the Cultural Heritage, Handicrafts and Tourism Organization of Iran.

== See also ==
- Shia Islam in Iran
- List of mosques in Iran
