= List of imamzadehs in Iran =

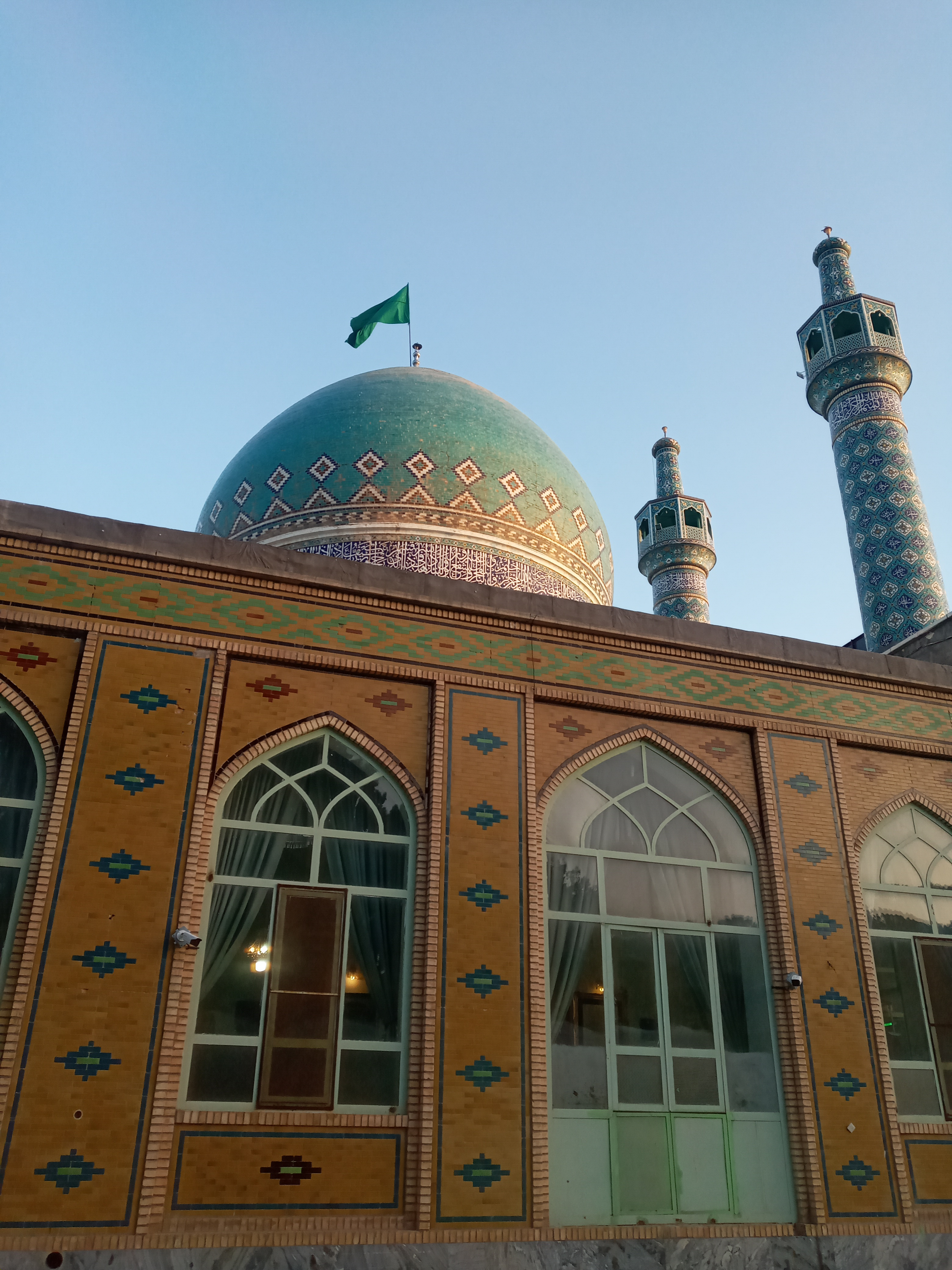
The Imamzadeh Seyed Morteza

Imāmzādeh is a Persian word for the shrine-tomb of an immediate descendant of a Shi'i Imam, as well as for the descendants themselves. This Persian term is also used in Urdu and Azeri. Imamzadeh means "offspring" or descendant of an imam. Other English transliterations include imamzada, imamzadah, and emamzadah. Imamzadeh are Sayyids (descendants of Muhammad) who are descended through the Imams.

== List of Imamzadehs ==
Name	Location	Image	Comments	Notes
Imamzadeh Ja'far	Borujerd		Built in the 11th century CE, Imamzadeh Jafar is one of the few examples of the architecture of the Seljuq and Ilkhanid eras in Iran. A very similar mausoleum is the Tomb of Daniel in Susa, south western Iran. The building is octagonal with a high dome in the center. The height of the conic-shaped dome is 25 m (82 ft) from the base.	
Imamzadeh Ja'far	Damghan County		The Imamzadeh is from the Timurid Empire era	
Imamzadeh Ahmad	Isfahan		The oldest part of the structure is a single piece of white stone, which is 3 m (9.8 ft) long. The stone is placed under a wooden reticulated window facing alley. It is said, that it is a piece of Somnath stone.	
Imamzadeh Esmaeil and Isaiah mausoleum	Isfahan		The oldest part of this complex is Saiah mosque (the place which is believed to be Isaiah's tomb) and remnants of a Seljukid minaret. Nastaliq inscription on the northern wall says, that this mosque dates back to Imam Ali's era, but according to archeological researches no parts of it is older than Seljuk era.	
Imamzadeh Haroun-e-Velayat	Isfahan		The Imamzadeh is located opposite the Ali minaret in Dardasht and is from the Ismail I era. There are many accounts of Harun Vilayat, the person who is buried in it. Some say that he is the sixth Imam's son and others, The mausoleum has become a shrine reputed to have miraculous powers and is also venerated by some Armenian Christians.	
Imamzadeh Ja'far	Isfahan		The Imamzadeh is located opposite the Esmaeil religious complex. It is one of the pre-eminent structures of the Ilkhanid era. It is related that this emamzadeh is the grave of Ja'far ibn Abī Tālib, a companion of Mohammad.	
Imamzadeh Shah Zeyd	Isfahan		The Imamzadeh Shah Zeyd is from the early Safavid era. It is well known for paintings on its walls. These paintings are about the Battle of Karbala. Cavalries are in most of the paintings, but there are also other elements such as veiled women, dead bodies, birds, mosques and even flowers and nightingales. The painter of the artworks is Abbas Shahzadeh. He has tried to use the available space as much as he can.	
Imamzadeh Hamzeh	Kashmar		The Imamzadeh is the oldest mosque in Kashmar, and includes the tomb of Hamza al-Hamza ibn Musa al-Kadhim, the garden and the public cemetery, and is as an Imamzadeh.	
Imamzadeh Mohammad	Kashmar County		The Imamzadeh Mohammad was completed in the period of modern Iranian history	
Imamzadeh Seyed Morteza	Kashmar		The Imamzadeh is from the Qajar dynasty and is located in Razavi Khorasan Province. Massive trees, waterfalls and swimming pools add to the attractions of this place, and on the other hand, a good number of living rooms provide a good base for traveling to this place, as well as the many shops and dining halls.	
Imamzadeh Hassan	Khalilabad County		The Imamzadeh Hassan is from the Qajar dynasty	
Imamzadeh Qasem	Khalilabad County		The Imamzadeh Qasem is located in Razavi Khorasan Province	
Imamzadeh Seyed Mohammad	Khomeyni Shahr County		The Imamzadeh is from the Ilkhanate	
Imamzadeh Hossein	Qazvin		The namesake of the tomb is the biennial deceased son of Imam Hossein. This passed in transit with his father to Khorasan in Qazvin in 821 and was buried at the site. Later more people were buried from the Safavid dynasty bib. Tahmasp I, who had his seat of government in Qazvin, built the tomb. His daughter Zeynab Begum expanded it in 1630, as is testified by a tile inscription.	
Imamzadeh Hadi	Ray		The Imamzadeh is from the Safavid dynasty	
Shah Abdol-Azim Shrine	Rey		Abdol Azim migrated to Rayy out of persecution and subsequently died there. A piece of paper was found in his pocket outlining his ancestry as being: ‘Abdul ‘Adhīm son of ‘Abdillāh son of ‘Alī son of Husayn son of Zayd son of Hasan ibn ‘Alī. Shah Abdol Azim was sent to Rayy (modern-day Tehran) by Imam Reza. His journey was full of hardships but he successfully reached there and delivered the message of Imam. He was one of the pious persons of his time. During his journey many spies of Abbasid Caliph Al-Matawakkil tried to capture him but failed. A movie on the life of Shah Abdol Azim Al-Hasani has been made and is available in Persian and Urdu languages.	
Imamzadeh Sultan Mutahhar	Rudehen		The Imamzadeh Sultan Mutahhar is an historical mausoleum, located in the Bumehen neighborhood of Roudehen. The current structure was rebuilt in the 15th century and contains the tomb of the murdered son of Jafar as Sadiq, the 6th Shia Imam.	
Imamzadeh Hossein (Kordan)	Savojbolagh County		The Imamzadeh is located in a village in the Chendar Rural District, Alborz Province. At the 2006 census, its population was 118, in 32 families.	
Imamzadeh Shahreza	Shahreza		The Imamzadeh is from the Safavid dynasty	
Imamzadeh Saleh	Shemiran		The main mausoleum building includes a large rectangular building with thick walls and solid inner space of almost 5.6 m^{2} (60 sq ft). In 700 AH (1300/1301 CE) Imam Zadeh Saleh there is an inscription that appears in the repair and alteration of entries has gone according to which the Kingdom of Ghazan Khan was at the same time. Imam Zadeh Saleh large wooden box inside the tomb probably belonged to the era of the late Safavid or Afsharid dynasties.	
Shah Cheragh	Shiraz		The site is the most important place of pilgrimage within the city of Shiraz. Ahmad came to Shiraz at the beginning of the third Islamic century (c. 900 CE), and died there. During the rule of Atabeg Abū Sa'id Zangi (~1130s CE) of the Zengid dynasty, the chief minister to the monarch by the name of Amir Muqarrab al-din Badr al-din built the tomb chamber, the dome, as well as a colonnaded porch.	
Imamzadeh Hamzah	Tabriz		Sayyid Abi al-Qasim Hamzah is a son of Imam Musa ibn Ja'far al-Kadhim who is credited for the genealogy of the Saffavids. Hence, the Imāmzādeh Hamzah is a "de facto ancestral cemetery". Thus, it strengthens the notability of its link to the mosque in Ardabil where the elite Saffavids have been buried. The style of decoration of the Hamzah Mosque is further enhanced and has therefore enjoyed sustained patronage.	
Imamzadeh Sayyid Muhammad Kojajani	Tabriz		The Imamzadeh-mosque complex contains the grave of Shams al-Din Sayyid Muhammad ben Sadiq ben Muhammad, descendant of the Twelver Shī‘ah Imām, Zayn al-‘Ābidīn.	
Imamzadeh Davood	Tehran		The Imamzadeh is from the Safavid dynasty	
Imamzadeh Hosein Reza	Varamin		The building is octagonal with a recessed blind arch on each face. It was originally free-standing, but at a much later stage an entrance aiwan was built against the east side and a small domed tomb against the south side. Two of the original four entrances have been blocked up. Brickwork is the sole means of exterior decoration.	
Imamzadeh Qasem	Zarqan		Imāmzādeh Qāsem is a tomb in Shiraz to Isfahan city in entries Zarghan located. Of about 10 years ago Board of Trustees of the shrine, and under the Religious Affairs Bureau and the basic work has been done.	

== See also ==
- Islam in Iran
- List of mosques in Iran
