= Imamzadeh =

Type of Shia Islamic holy person or shrine-tomb of a holy person

An imamzadeh (Persian: امامزاده, romanized: emāmzādeh, lit. 'Descendant of the Imams') is a Persian term with two related meanings: a type of holy person in Shia Islam, and the shrine-tomb of such a person.

== Descendant ==
An imamzadeh is an immediate descendant of a Shi'i Imam. The term is also used in Hindi, Urdu, Punjabi and Azeri. Imamzadeh means "offspring" or descendant of an imam. There are many different ways of spelling the word in English, such as imamzada, imamzadah and emamzadah. Imamzadeh are basically the Syed's or Syeds as they have descended from the Imams. Imamzadehs are also sayyids, though not all sayyids are considered imamzadehs.

There are many important imamzadehs. Two of these are Fātimah bint Mūsā, the sister of Imam Ali al-Ridha, the eighth Twelver Imam, and Zaynab bint Ali, daughter of Ali, considered by Shi'i Muslims to be the first Imam and by Sunni Muslims as the fourth Rashid. Imamzadehs are not traditionally women.

== Shrine tomb ==
Imamzadeh is also a term for a shrine-tomb of the descendants of Imams, who are directly related to Muhammad. The shrines are only for the descendants of Imams and they are not for the Imams themselves. The shrine-tombs are used as centers of Shi'i devotion and pilgrimage. They are believed to have miraculous properties and the ability to heal. Many of them are located in Iraq, Medina (Saudi Arabia), India and Iran.

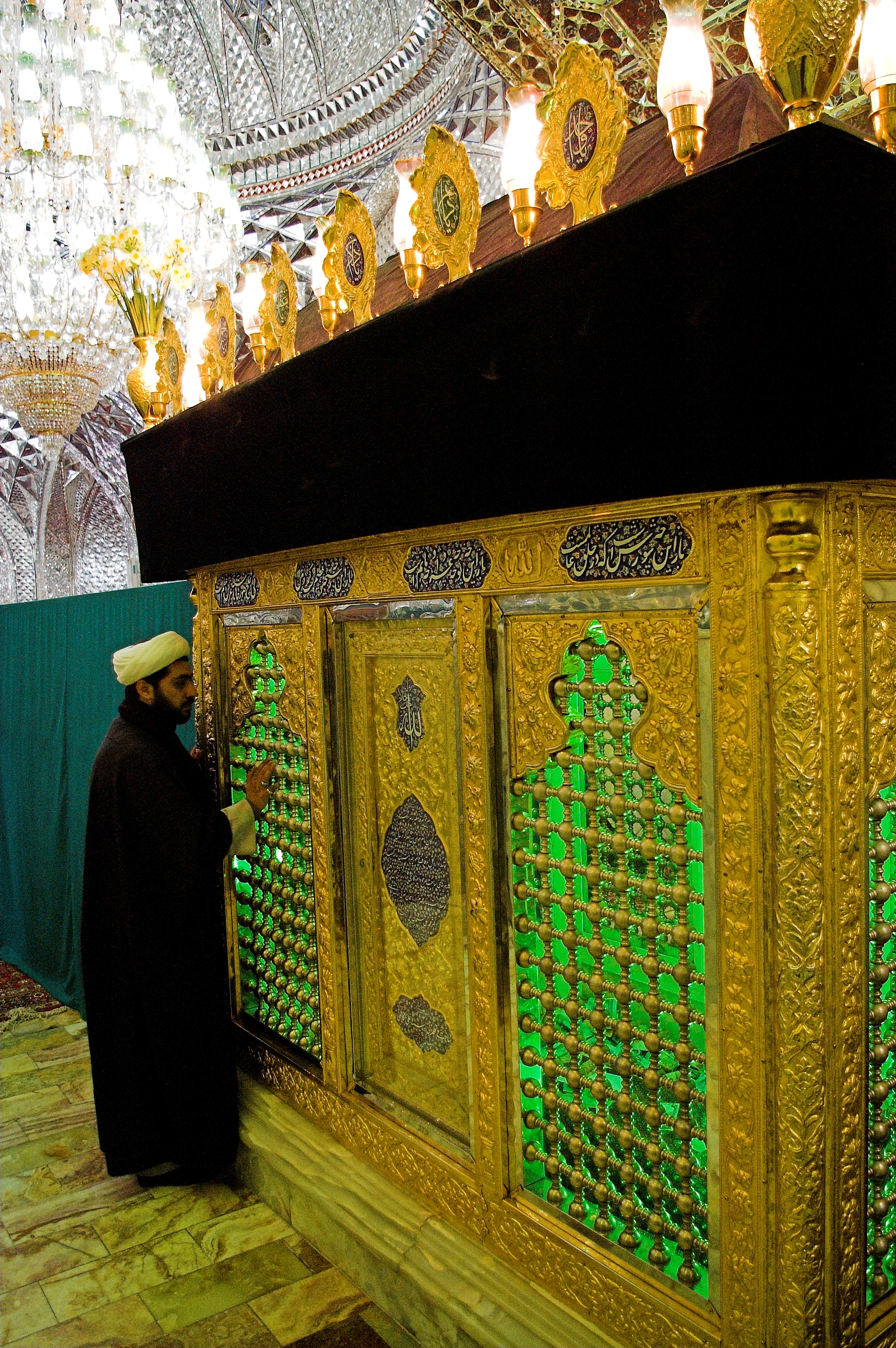
A Mullah praying in Imāmzādeh Sayyid Hamzah, Tabriz

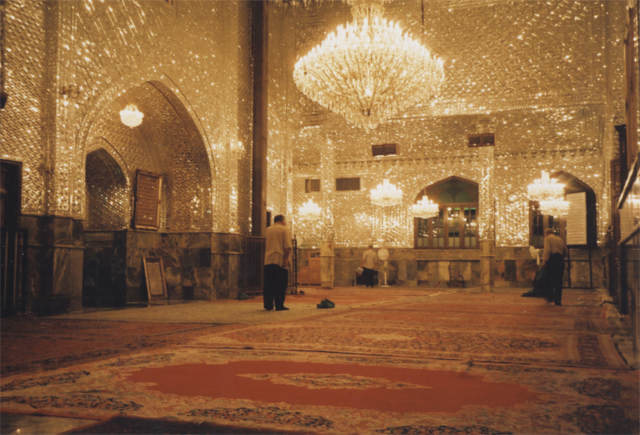
The interiors of many Imamzadehs are covered with mirrors to create a brilliant display of light.

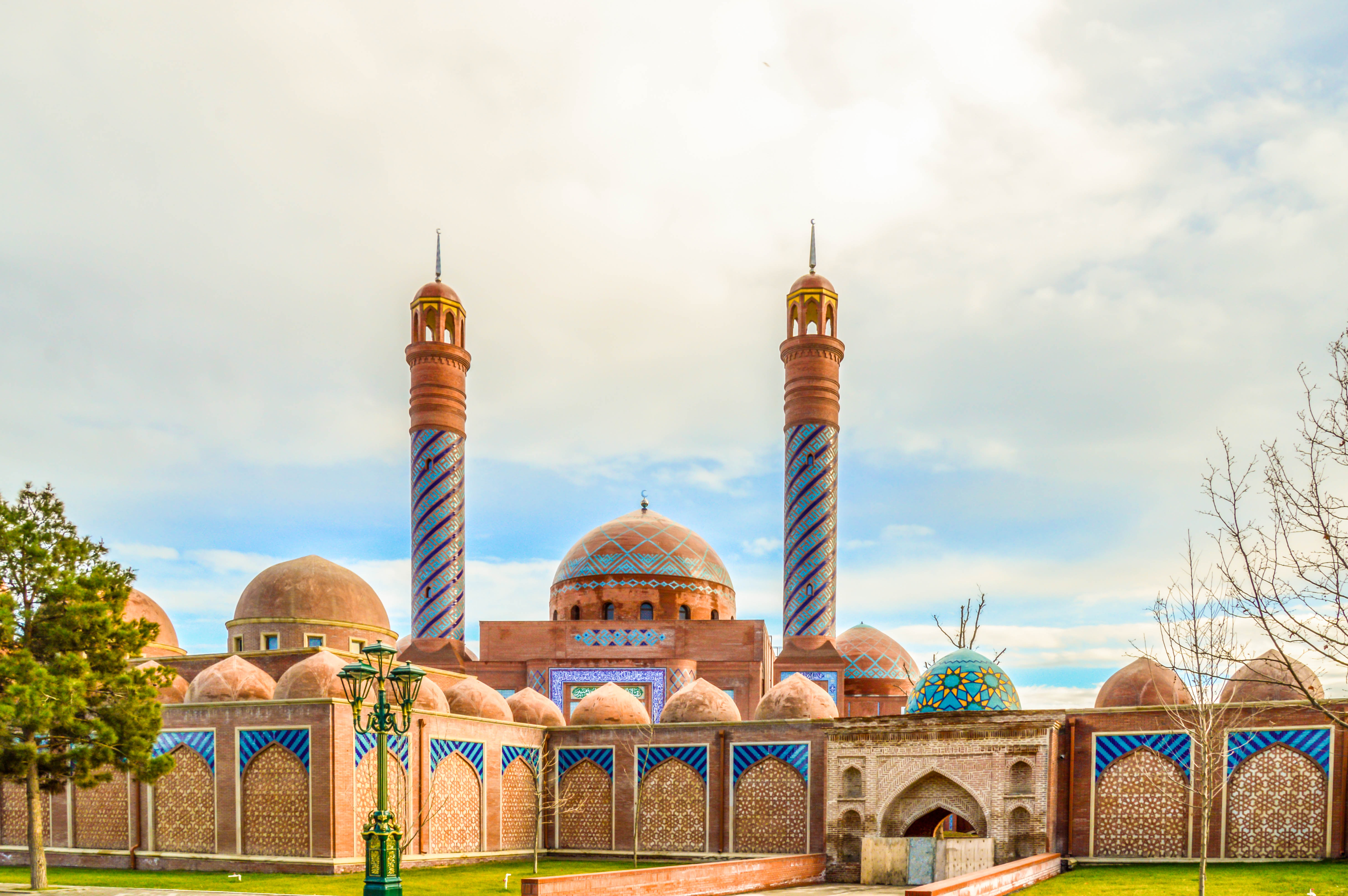
Imamzadeh in Ganja, Azerbaijan

Many people visit nearby imamzadehs, and there are specific ziyarat-namas (pilgrimages) dedicated to many of them. Some of these pilgrimages are held annually during particular times of the year However, not all imamzadehs are equally well-maintained; some are in better condition than others. According to Reinisch, one imamzadeh he visited was in ruins, yet it remains an important site

=== Popular culture ===
The Imamzadehs were so influential that some cities or parts of cities are named after the Imamzadehs who are buried there, for example, Torbat-e Heydarieh, Astaneh-ye Ashrafiyeh in Gilan, Astaneh near Arak, and Shahreza.

=== Notable shrine-tombs ===
- Shah Abdol-Azim Shrine
- Imamzadeh Ahmad
- Tomb of Seyed Alaeddin Husayn
- Tomb of Ali ibn Hamzah, Shiraz
- Shah Cheragh
- Imamzadeh Esmaeil and Isaiah mausoleum
- Imamzadeh Complex, Ganja
- Imamzadeh Hamzah, Tabriz
- Imamzadeh Hamzeh, Kashmar
- Imamzadeh Haroun-e-Velayat
- Imamzade Hossein, Qazvin
- Imamzadeh Ja'far, Borujerd
- Imamzadeh Ja'far, Damghan
- Imamzadeh Ja'far, Isfahan
- Imamzadeh Mohammad
- Imamzadeh Saleh, Shemiran
- Imamzadeh Seyed Morteza
- Imamzadeh Shah Zeyd
- Imamzadeh Sultan Mutahhar, in Rudehen, Iran

== See also ==
- Holiest sites in Shia Islam
- Islamic architecture
- Sayyid
- Shia clergy
- Ziyarat
