= List of mausoleums in Iran =

This is a list of mausoleums in Iran, sorted by period established. A mausoleum is a building constructed as a monument enclosing a grave of a person or a group of people. In Iran, a mausoleum can be a standalone building, or it can be attached to a mosque or even function as a mosque. Sometimes such buildings can be known as an Imamzadeh.

Mausoleum name	Established		Location		Image	Notes
Mausoleum name	Era	Year (CE)	City/village	Province	Image	Notes
Tomb of Artaxerxes I of Persia	Achaemenid		Marvdasht	Fars		
Tomb of Xerxes I	Achaemenid		Marvdasht	Fars		
Tomb of Darius II	Achaemenid		Marvdasht	Fars		
Tomb of Cyrus the Great	Achaemenid	6th century BCE	Pasargadae	Fars		
Gur-e-Dokhtar	Achaemenid	6th century BCE	Dashtestan	Bushehr		
Fakhrigah	Pre-Islamic (unknown)		near Mahabad	West Azerbaijan		
Mausoleum of Ali al-Ridha at the Imam Reza shrine	Abbasid	818	Mashhad	Razavi Khorasan		
Tomb of Nizam al-Mulk	Seljuk	c. 1090s	Esfahan	Isfahan		
Imamzadeh Chaharmanar (closed since 1965)	Seljuk	c. 11th century	Tabriz	East Azerbaijan		
Al-Rashid Mausoleum	Seljuk	1138	Esfahan	Isfahan		
Shah Cheragh	Seljuk	12th century	Shiraz	Fars		
Tomb of Wais-e Nāzār	Seljuk		Kermanshah	Kermanshah		
Tomb of the Prophet Habakkuk	Seljuk	13th century	Tuyserkan	Hamadan		
Chahar Padshahan	Karkiya	13th century	Lahijan	Gilan		
Tomb of Saadi		13th century	Shiraz	Fars		
Chehel Dokhtaran Mausoleum	Ilkhanid	13th century	Kashan	Isfahan		
Monar Jonban	Ilkhanid	1316	Esfahan	Isfahan		
Mausoleum of Prophet Qeydar	Ilkhanid	1319	Qeydar	Zanjan		
Baba Ghassem Mausoleum	Ilkhanid	1341	Esfahan	Isfahan		
Soltan Bakht Agha Mausoleum	Ilkhanid	1375	Esfahan	Isfahan		
Tomb of Shaykh Haydar	Ilkhanid	14th century	Meshginshahr	Ardabil		
Mausoleum of Awn and Zayd, sons of Ali	Ilkhanid	14th century	Eynali, Tabriz	East Azerbaijan		
Mausoleum of Baba Rokneddin	Ilkhanid	14th century	Esfahan	Isfahan		
Tomb of Bibi Dokhtaran	Ilkhanid		Shiraz	Fars		
Shahshahan Mausoleum	Timurid	1449	Esfahan	Isfahan		
Tomb of Qara Qoyunlu emir Jahan Shah	Qarā Qoyunlu	1465	Tabriz	East Azerbaijan		
Mausoleum of Attar of Nishapur	Timurid	15th century	Nishapur	Razavi Khorasan		
Tomb of Shaykh Zahed Gilani	Safavid	15th century	Lahijan	Gilan		
Tomb of Pir Palandouz	Safavid	1577	Mashhad	Razavi Khorasan		
Sheikh Safi al-Din Khānegāh and Shrine Ensemble	Safavid	c. 16th century	Ardabil	Ardabil		
Tomb of Khajeh Rabie	Safavid	1617	Mashhad	Razavi Khorasan		
Tomb of Shaykh Aminuddin Gabriel	Safavid	1622	Kalkhuran Sheykh	Ardabil		
Mausoleum of Safavid Princes	Safavid	1632	Esfahan	Isfahan		
Javan Mard-e Ghassab Tomb	Qajar		Shahr-e Ray	Tehran		
Mushtaqieh Dome	Qajar	1838	Kerman	Kerman		
Tomb of Hassan Modarres	Pahlavi	1943	Kashmar	Razavi Khorasan		
Mausoleum of Reza Shah (destroyed)	Pahlavi	1950	Ray	Tehran		
Avicenna Mausoleum	Pahlavi	1953	Hamadan	Hamadan		
Mausoleum of Omar Khayyám	Pahlavi	1963	Nishapur	Razavi Khorasan		
Tomb of Nader Shah	Pahlavi	1963	Mashhad	Razavi Khorasan		
Saeb Mausoleum	Pahlavi	1967	Esfahan	Isfahan		
Mausoleum of Ruhollah Khomeini		2025	Tehran	Tehran		

== See also ==
- Islam in Iran
- List of imamzadehs in Iran
- List of mosques in Iran
