= Sidi Bashir Mosque =

Former mosque in Ahmedabad, Gujarat, India

Coordinates: 23.023694°N 72.599778°E

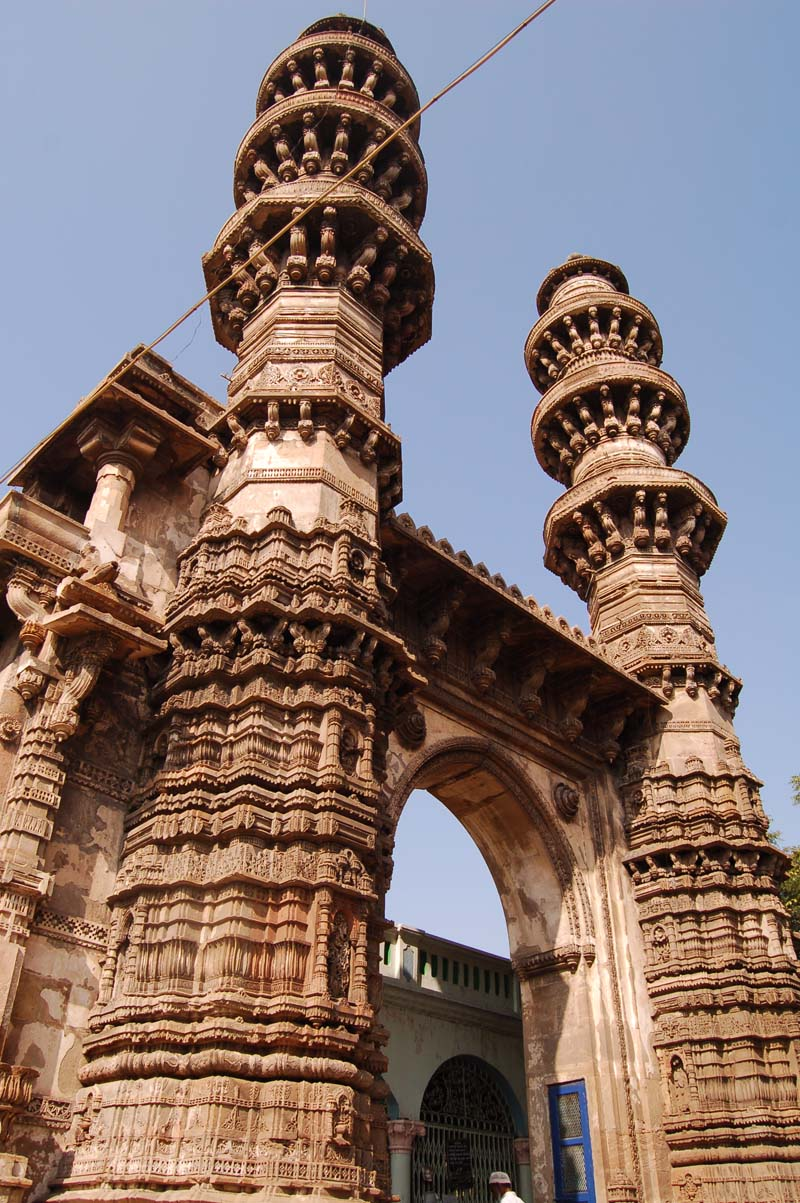
- The Jhulta Minars mosque

- Location of the mosque in Ahmedabad

Religion
- Affiliation: Sufi Islam
- Ecclesiastical or organizational status: Mosque (1452–1753)
- Status: (partial ruinous state)

Location
- Location: Ahmedabad, Gujarat
- Country: India
- Interactive map of Sidi Bashir Mosque

Architecture
- Type: Mosque architecture
- Style: Indo-Islamic
- Completed: 1452
- Minaret: Two

Monument of National Importance
- Official name: Jhulta Minar
- Reference no.: N-GJ-14

The Sidi Bashir Mosque is a former Sufi mosque, now in partial ruins in Ahmedabad, Gujarat, India. Only the central gateway and two minarets survive; they are known as the Jhulta Minar or Shaking Minarets. The structure is a Monument of National Importance.

The Jhulta Minar, a part of the Siddi Bashir Mosque, is a notable example of Indo-Islamic architecture built in 1461 CE. The three-storey tall structure, with intricate designs on each of the minarets, is known for swaying when minimal force is applied to its uppermost arc. A gentle shaking of either minaret results in the vibration of the other minaret after a few seconds, though the connecting passage remains free of any vibration. This unconventional structure is a mystery, unsolved by engineers. According to popular belief, the Jhulta Minar was built to receive early signals of earthquakes.

== History ==
The mosque is believed to have been constructed either by Sidi Bashir, a slave of Sultan Ahmed Shah, or by Malik Sarang, a noble in the court of Mahmud Begada, another Sultan of Gujarat. Construction was dated from 1452, although the style and material of the minarets point to the close of Mahmud Begada's reign in 1511, or later. The body of the building was destroyed in 1753 during the war between the Marathas and Jawān Mard Khān, Mughal governor of Gujarat; only two minarets and the arched central gateway connecting them remain.

== Minarets ==
The minarets are the tallest in Ahmedabad and are located to the north of Ahmedabad Junction railway station. Though much damaged, especially near their footings, the stairs inside the minarets may be used. The minarets are three stories tall with carved balconies. A gentle shaking of either minaret results in the other minaret vibrating after a few seconds, though the connecting passage between them remains free of vibration. The mechanism behind this phenomenon is not known, although the layered construction is thought to be a factor. The phenomenon was first observed in the 19th century by Monier M. Williams, an English Sanskrit scholar. The minarets are able to withstand fast-moving trains passing close by.

Entry to the shaking minaret was prohibited following an incident in 1981 at Qutb Minar in Delhi, when a stampede resulted in the deaths of many children. There is also damage to the upper sections.

== Other shaking minarets ==
The Raj Bibi Mosque, also in Ahmedabad, also had shaking minarets similar to those at the Sidi Bashir Mosque. Under the British Raj, one was dismantled in order to study the construction, but could not be reassembled.

The Monar Jonban (shaking minarets), in Isfahan, Iran, has almost the same properties.

A further example is a large mosque built by Makhdu-Ma-I-Jahan, mother of Sultan Qutubuddin Ahmad Shah II in 1454 CE, who is buried in the mausoleum situated to the east of the Sidi Bashir Mosque.

== Gallery ==
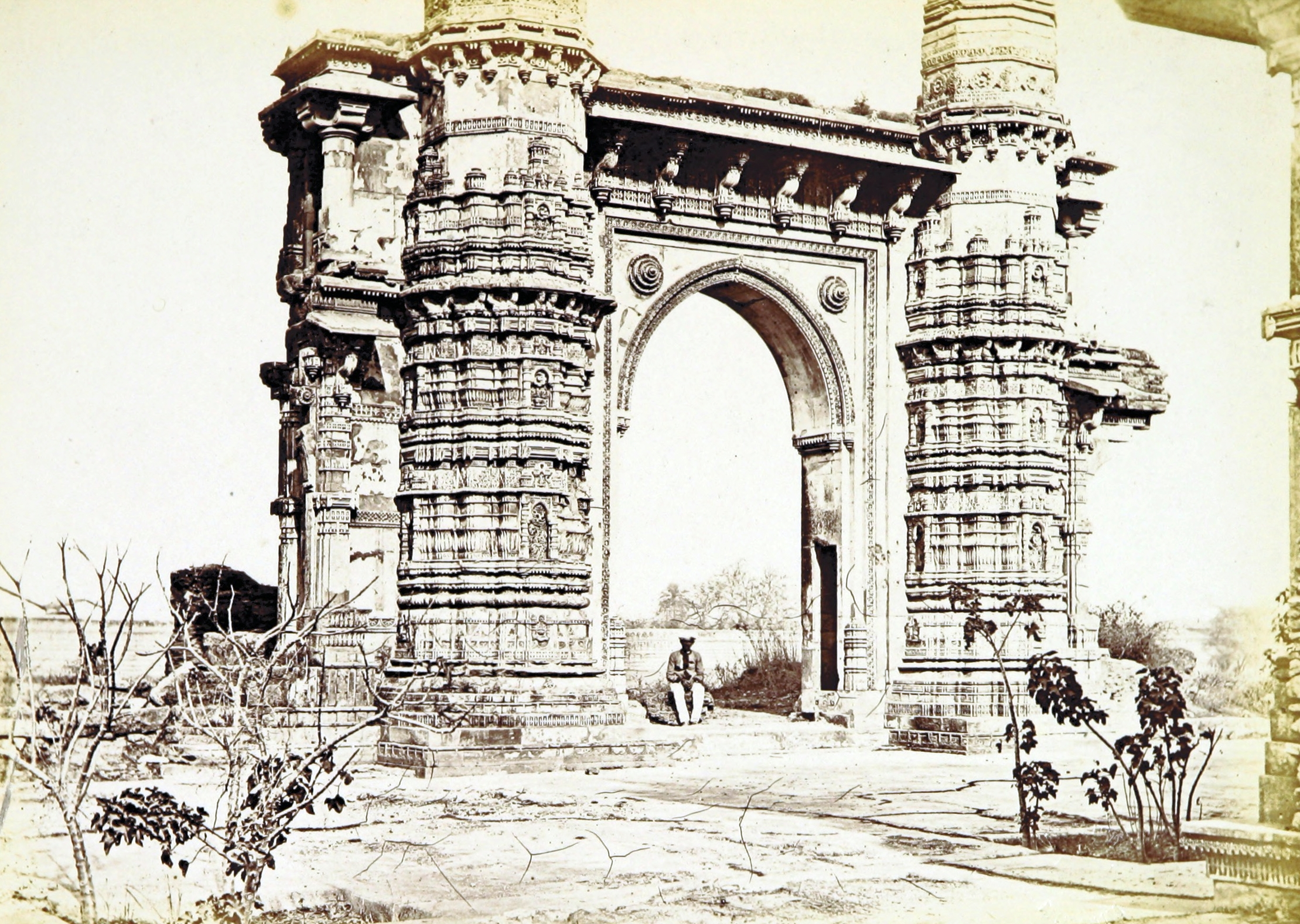
Ruins of the former mosque, in 1866

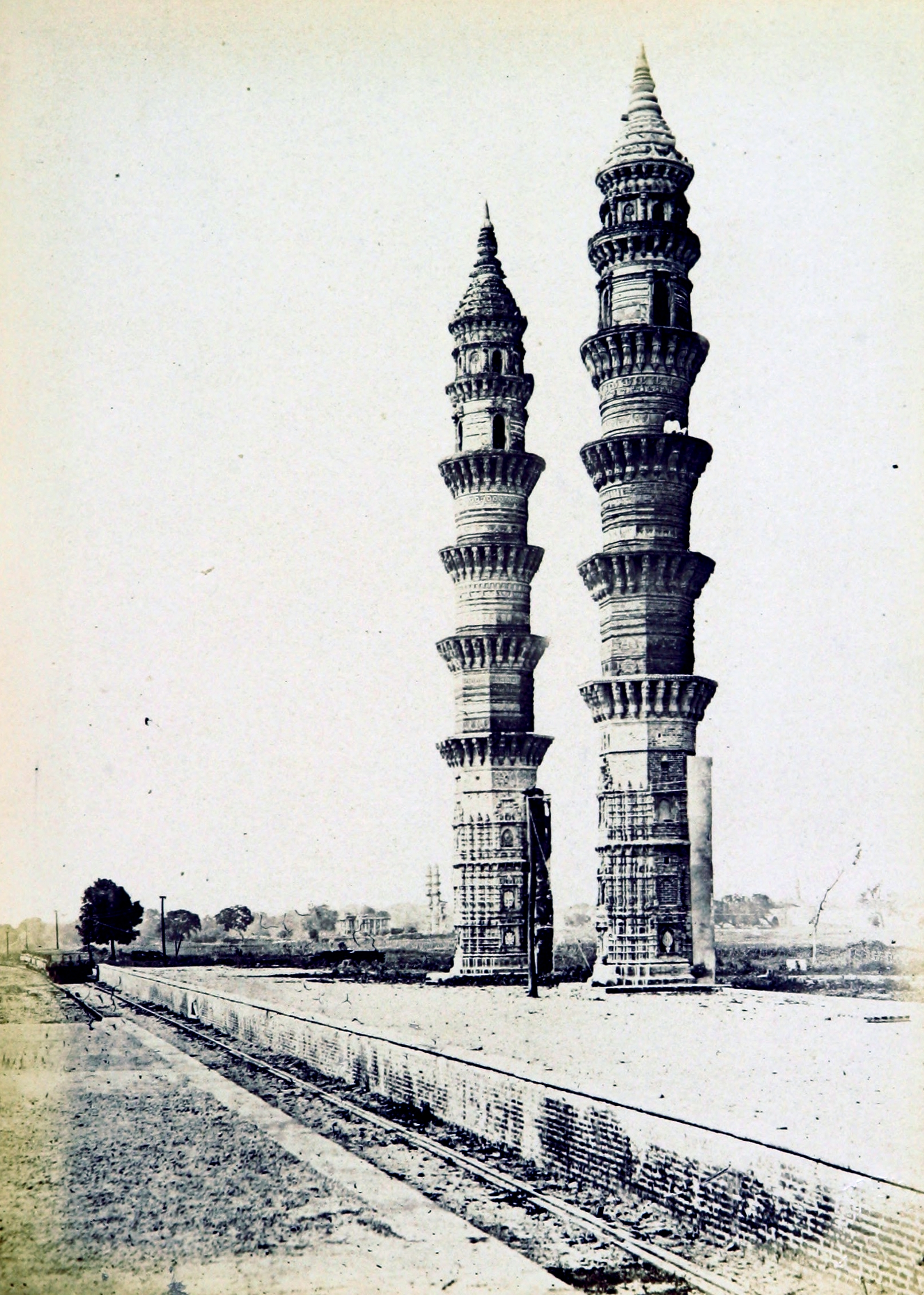
Minarets of the former mosque, in 1866

== See also ==
- Islam in India
- List of mosques in India
- List of Monuments of National Importance in Gujarat
