= Eynali Cable =

Coordinates: 38°5′38″N 46°19′37″E

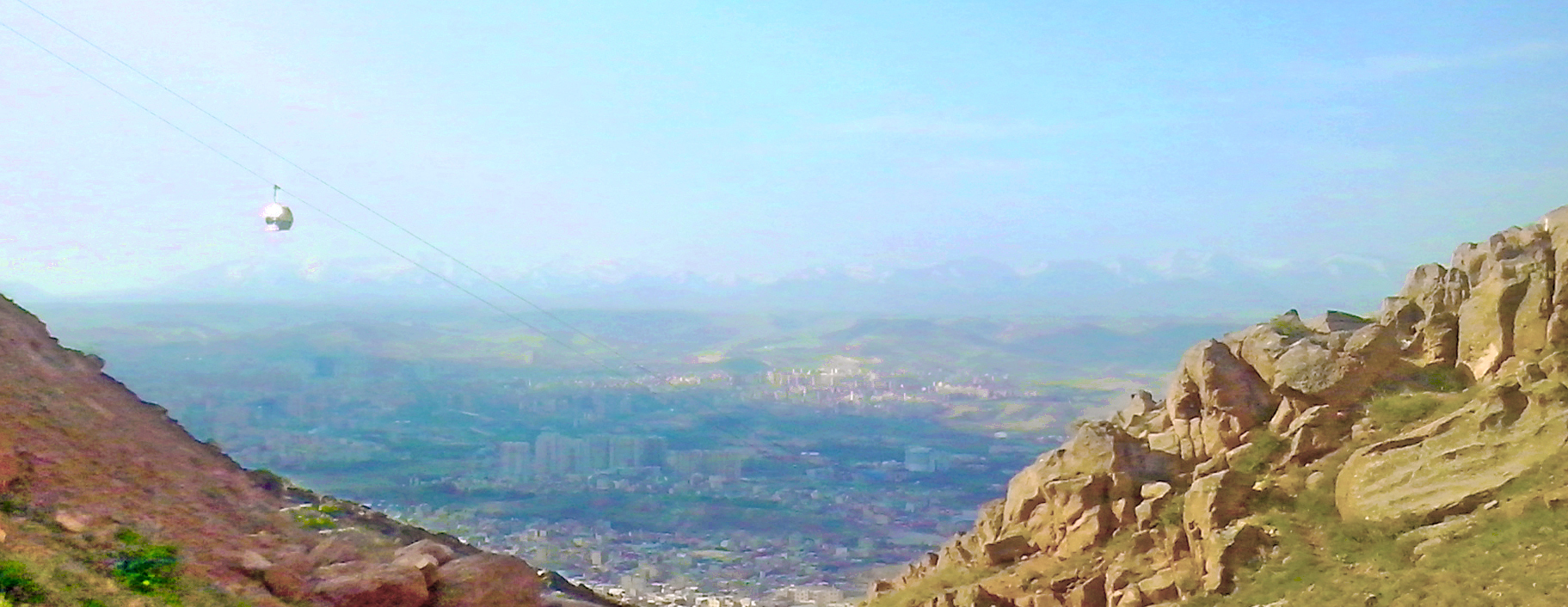
Eynali Cable, Tabriz in the background.

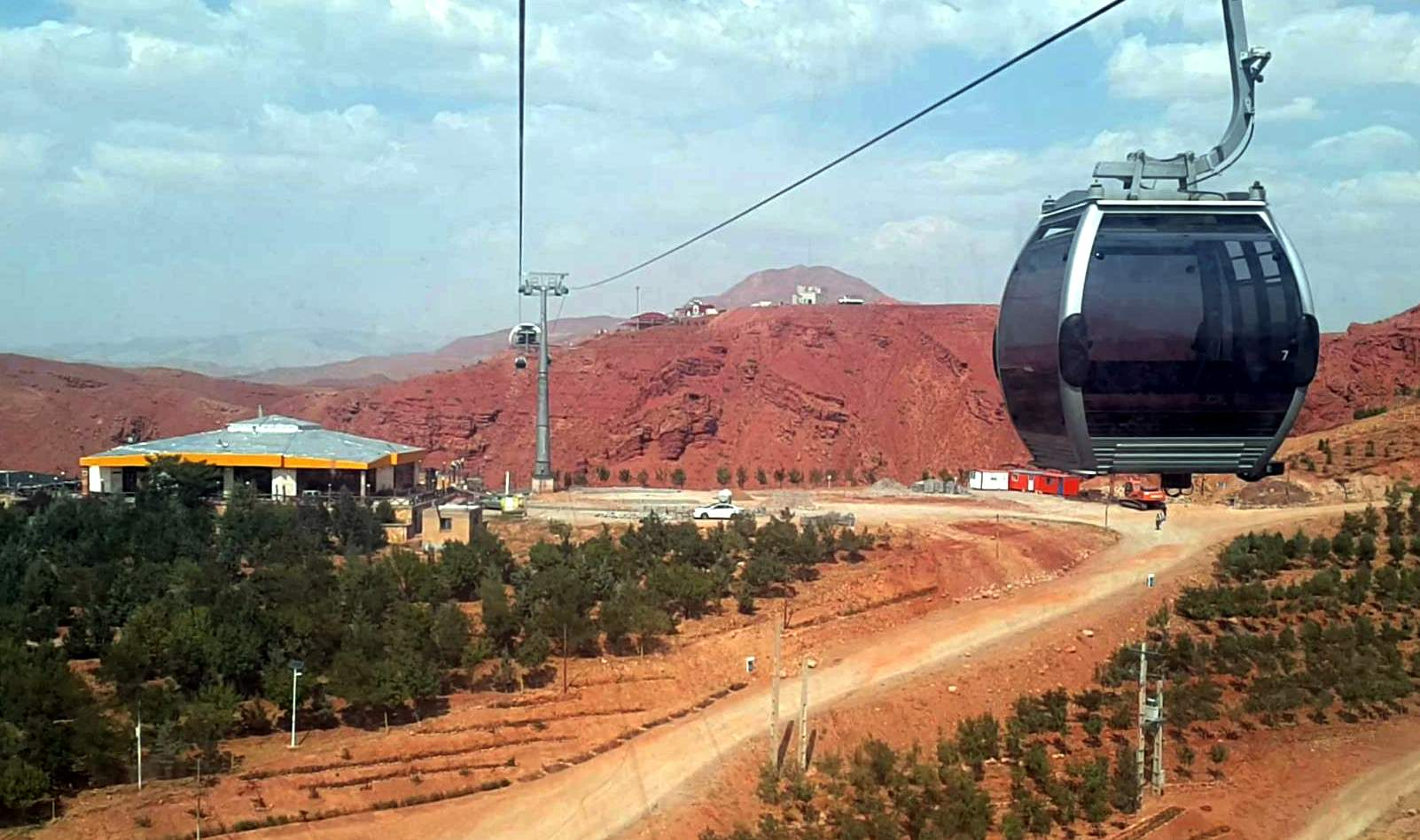
Eynali cable close to the first station.

Eynali Cable is a gondola lift in Mount Eynali at North of Tabriz, Iran. The lift is designed to be a three stage lift and the first phase is operational since Fall 2010.
