= Tomb of Wais-e Nāzār =

Sunni mausoleum in Kermanshah Province, Iran

- آرامگاه ویس نازار
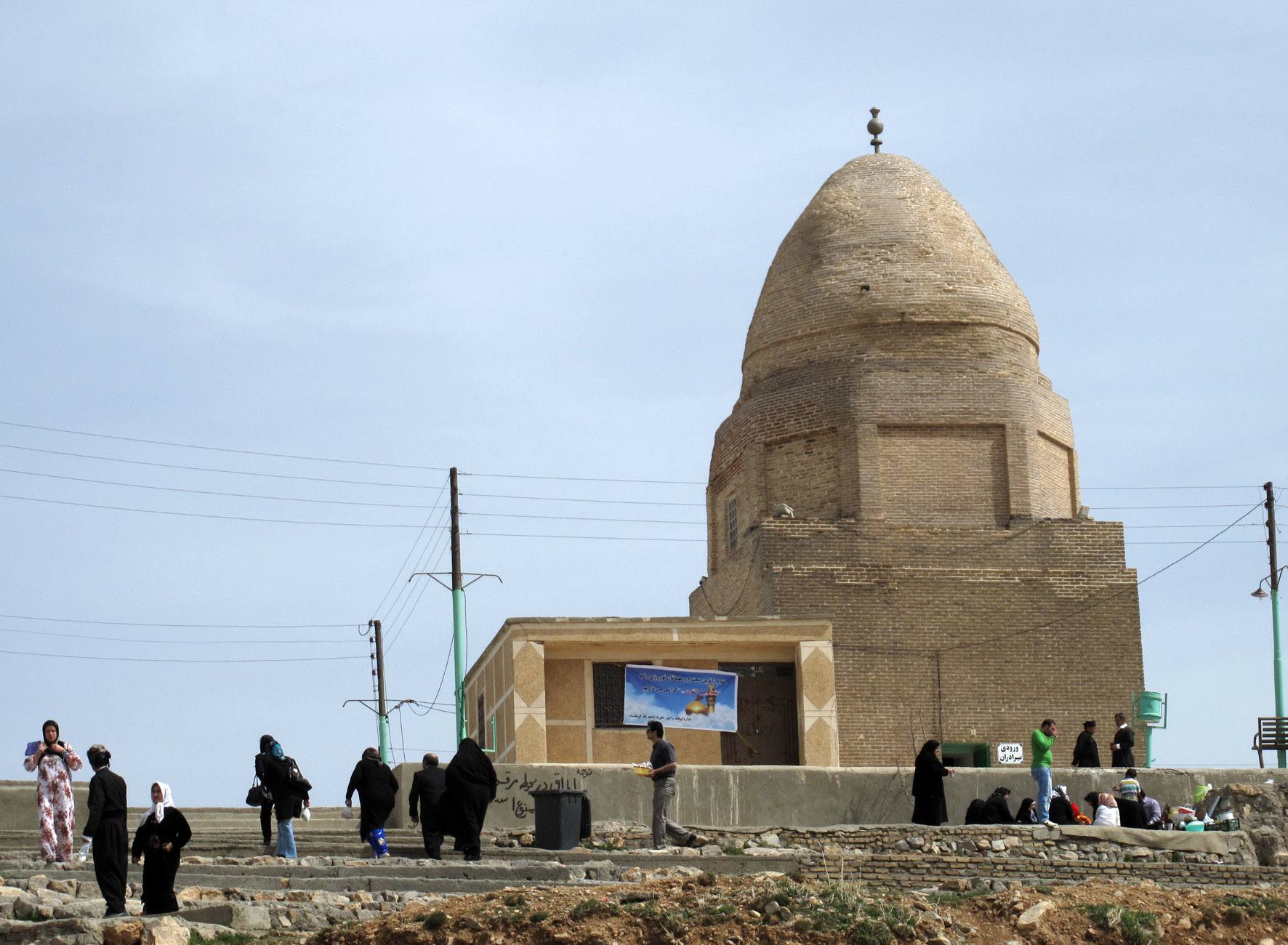
- The tomb in 2012

- Location of the complex in Iran

Religion
- Affiliation: Sunni Islam
- Ecclesiastical or organizational status: Mausoleum
- Status: Active

Location
- Location: near Kermanshah, Brimavand, Ravansar County, Kermanshah Province
- Country: Iran
- Interactive map of Tomb of Wais-e Nāzār
- Coordinates: 34°31′38″N 46°50′57″E

Architecture
- Type: Islamic architecture
- Style: Seljuk

Specifications
- Dome: One
- Materials: Brick

Iran National Heritage List
- Official name: Mausoleum of Veys
- Type: Built
- Designated: 1975
- Reference no.: 1054
- Conservation organization: Cultural Heritage, Handicrafts and Tourism Organization of Iran

The Tomb of Wais-e Nāzār (Persian: آرامگاه ویس نازار) is a Sunni mausoleum, located near city of Kermanshah, in the province of Kermanshah, Iran. It is located on the top of a hill, 35 kilometres (22 mi) from the city of Ravansar. The deceased person entombed in the mausoleum is traditionally attributed to be Owais al-Qarani, one of the Tabi'een who died in the Battle of Siffin. The building was added to the Iran National Heritage List in 1975, administered by the Cultural Heritage, Handicrafts and Tourism Organization of Iran.

== History ==
The mausoleum was first constructed during the Seljuk period. In the 21st century, the mausoleum was completely refurbished and renovated. A husayniyya was attached to the tomb, and other facilities like a bazaar and a skydiving center were built in the areas adjacent to the tomb. In 1954, the mausoleum was designated as a national heritage monument.

As of 2023, the tomb was predominantly visited by Iranian Kurds, who are usually Sunnis.

== The identity of the entombed ==
The geographer, Hamdallah Mustawfi, wrote that the grave of Owais al-Qarani was located near Kermanshah after he died in the Battle of Siffin. But due to Owais also having a tomb attributed to him in Raqqa, Syria within the grounds of the now-destroyed Uwais al-Qarni Mosque, the identity of the entombed here is contested. An alternative theory suggests that the mausoleum was built for one of the mystics of the Uwaisi Sufi order, who had a very similar name.

== See also ==
- List of mausoleums in Iran
- Sunni Islam in Iran
