= Mausoleum of Awn ibn Ali =

Mosque and shrine on Eynali mountain, Tabriz, Iran

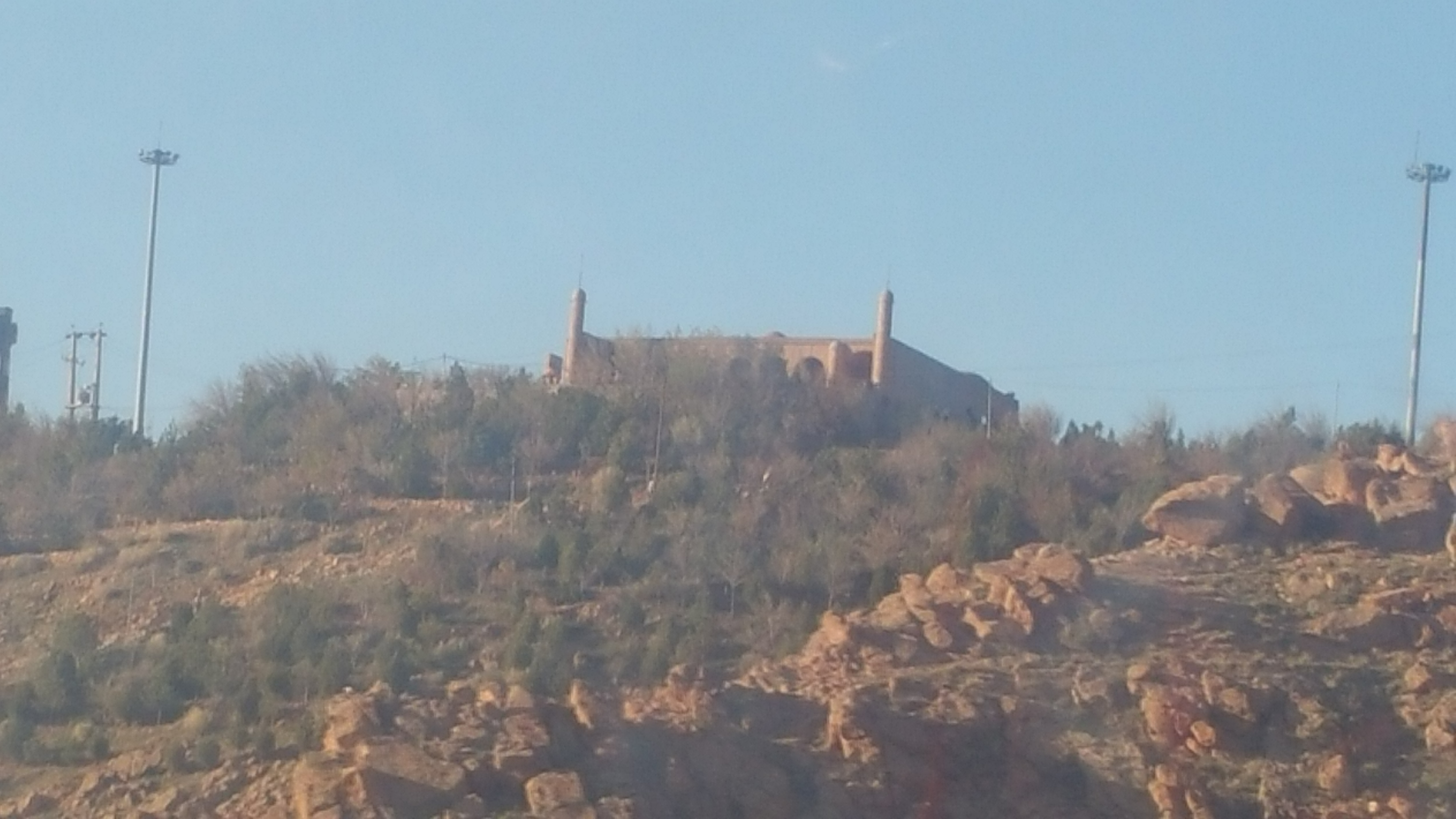
- The shrine of Awn ibn Ali, as seen from the bottom of Eynali mountain

- Location of the mosque and mausoleum in Iran

Religion
- Affiliation: Islam
- Branch/tradition: Shia (Twelver)
- Ecclesiastical or organizational status: Imamzadeh and mausoleum
- Status: Active

Location
- Location: Eynali, Tabriz, East Azerbaijan
- Country: Iran
- Interactive map of Mausoleum of Awn ibn Ali
- Coordinates: 38°06′07″N 46°19′46″E

Architecture
- Type: Mosque architecture
- Style: Safavid
- Completed: 14th century (original building); 19th century (restoration)

Specifications
- Dome: Six
- Minaret: Two
- Shrine: Two sons of Ali ibn Abi Talib

The Mausoleum of Awn ibn Ali (Persian: بقعه عون بن علی), also known as the Imamzadeh Awn ibn Ali and the Imamzadeh Zayd ibn Ali, is a Twelver Shia imamzadeh and mausoleum complex, located on the Eynali mountain, north of Tabriz, in the province of East Azerbaijan, Iran. The shrine, one of the many Imamzadeh shrines of Iran, dates from the 14th century and it contains two tombs, said to be of two sons of Ali ibn Abi Talib.

== History ==
The site of the building was originally a Zoroastrian fire temple which was converted into a mosque during the Rashidun conquest of Persia. During the Ilkhanate era, the building was rebuilt into a shrine-mausoleum for Awn and Zayd, two sons of Ali ibn Abi Talib.

The mosque and shrine were damaged in the events following the Battle of Chaldiran. The building was then rebuilt during the reign of Shah Abbas I. Later on, the 1641 Tabriz earthquake completely destroyed the mosque and shrine. Many years after Safavid rule had ended, the building was restored during the Qajar period, by Jalal al-Din Mirza Qajar.

== See also ==
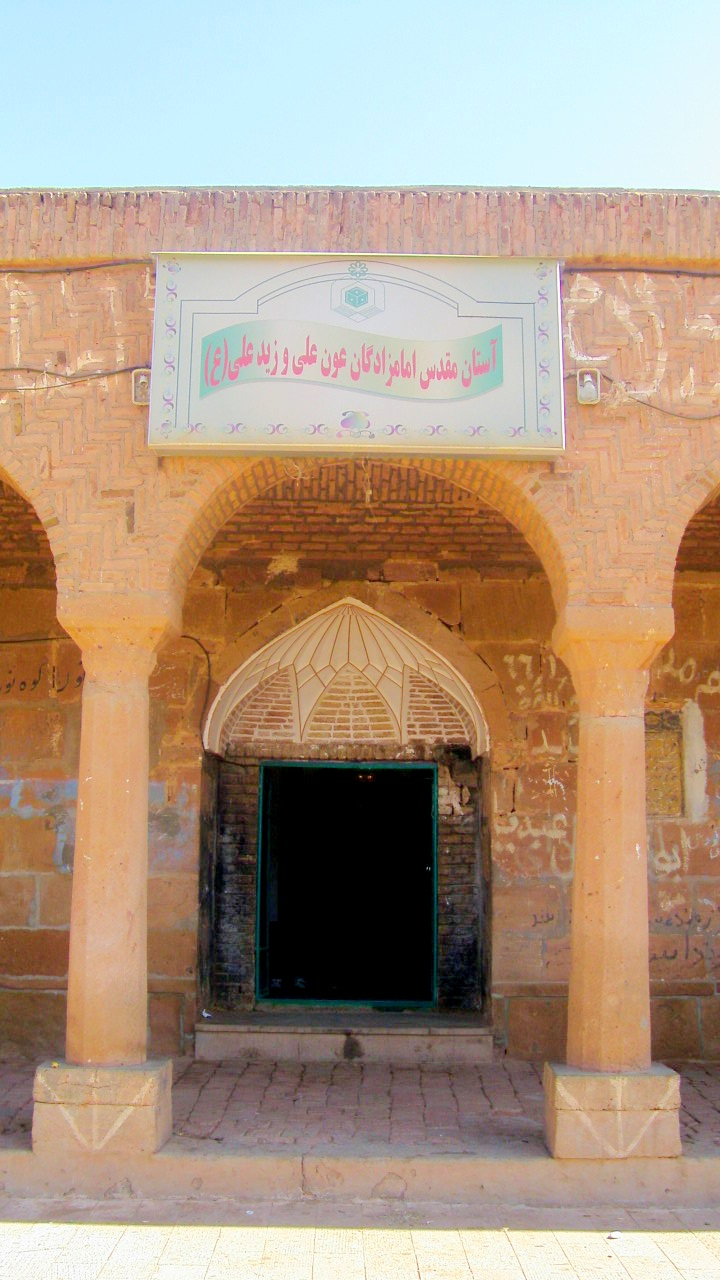
One of the entrances to the building

- Shia Islam in Iran
- List of mosques in Iran
- List of imamzadehs in Iran
- List of mausoleums in Iran
