= Baba Ghassem Mausoleum =

Mausoleum in Isfahan, Iran

- آرامگاه باباقاسم
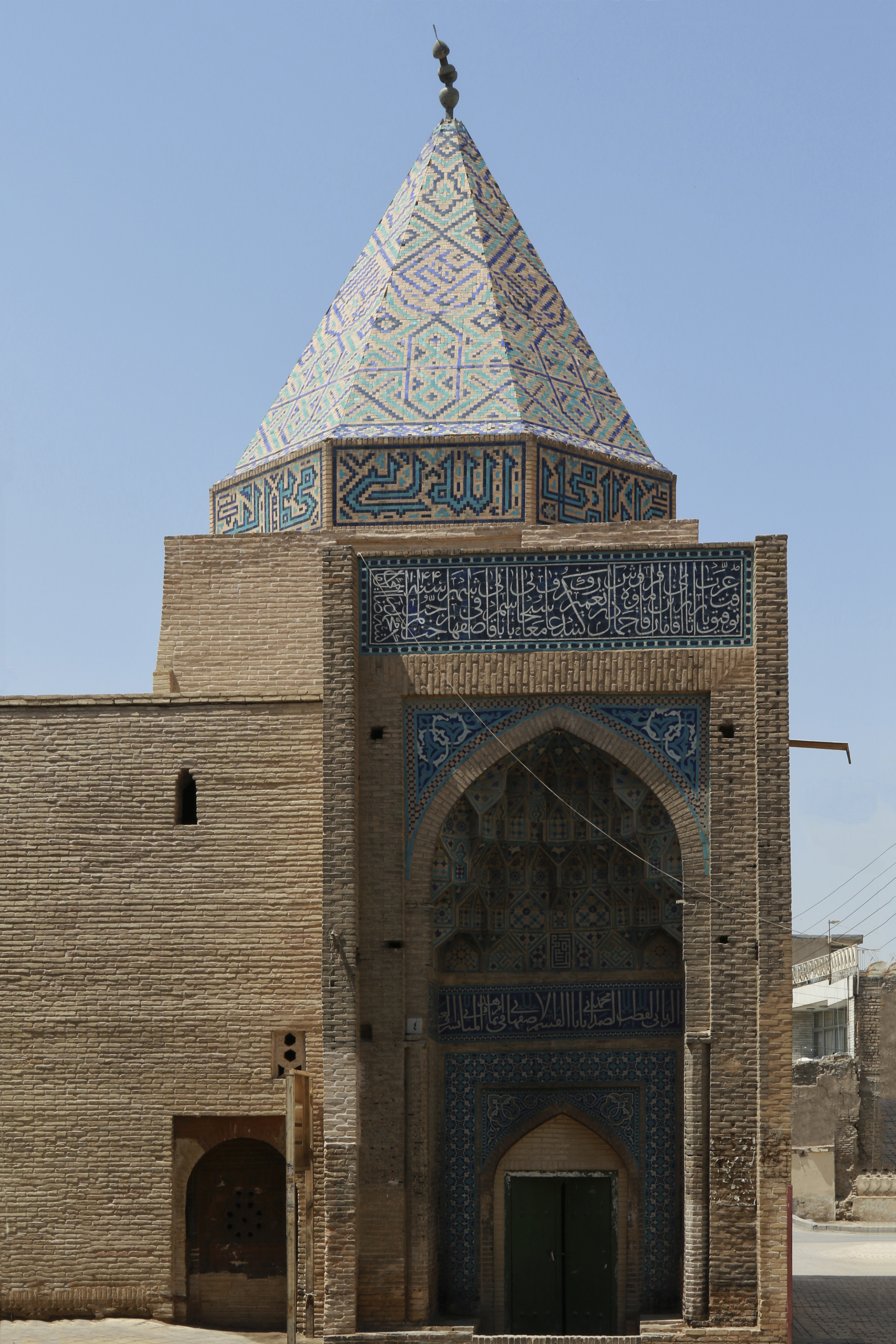
- The mausoleum in 2018

- Location of the complex in Iran

Religion
- Affiliation: Islam
- Ecclesiastical or organisational status: Mausoleum
- Status: Active

Location
- Location: Esfahan, Isfahan province
- Country: Iran
- Interactive map of Baba Ghassem Mausoleum
- Coordinates: 32°40′22.7″N 51°41′11.8″E

Architecture
- Type: Islamic architecture
- Style: Ilkhanid; Safavid
- Completed: 1341 CE; 1635 CE (renovation); 1880 CE (renovation)
- Materials: Bricks; adobe; plaster; tiles
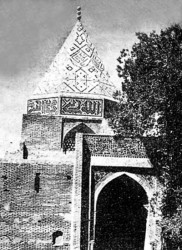
- An undated black-and-white photograph of the mausoleum

Iran National Heritage List
- Official name: Baba Ghassem Mausoleum
- Type: Mausoleum
- Designated: 1932
- Reference no.: 100
- Conservation organization: Cultural Heritage, Handicrafts and Tourism Organization of Iran

The Baba Ghassem Mausoleum (Persian: آرامگاه باباقاسم), also known as the Baba Qasem Mausoleum, is a mausoleum in the Ebn-e Sina district of the city of Esfahan, in the province of Isfahan, Iran. The building was completed in 1431 CE, during the Ilkhanid era; and is located to the north of Jameh Mosque of Isfahan.

The complex was added to the Iran National Heritage List on 6 January 1932, administered by the Cultural Heritage, Handicrafts and Tourism Organization of Iran.

== History ==
Baba Ghassem, also known as Baba Qasim al-Isfahani, was a religious teacher and a Sufi mystic. He would teach at a madrasah in Isfahan. Not much is known about his life. When he died, he was buried next to the madrasah. In the years 1340–1341, his student, Sulayman ibn Abu'l Husayn ibn Talut al-Damghani, built a mausoleum over his grave with a conical dome. During the reign of Safavid ruler Shah Safi, the building was renovated by a local patron.

== Architecture ==
Rectangular in shape, the building is topped by a conical dome that has eight layers. On the base of the dome, the words Allah-Tauba, Nabi Muhammad, Din-i-Islam, and Imam Ali are visible in a repeated manner. The entrance has a shabestan with an arch above full of muqarnas.

Inside the building, there is a wooden door with Thuluth inscriptions on it, leading to the domed tomb chamber. Under the dome, two inscriptions made with mosaic tiles can be seen. One of them is written around the nave (below the dome's base) and contains phrases from the Qur'an. The other inscription written below the first inscription refers to the name of the founder of the mausoleum.

Inside the mausoleum, the grave of Baba Ghassem is located underneath the dome enclosed by a wooden cage-like structure. A standalone grave is also present, and it is dedicated to an unknown individual named "Mirza Ali" who died in 1577.

== Gallery ==
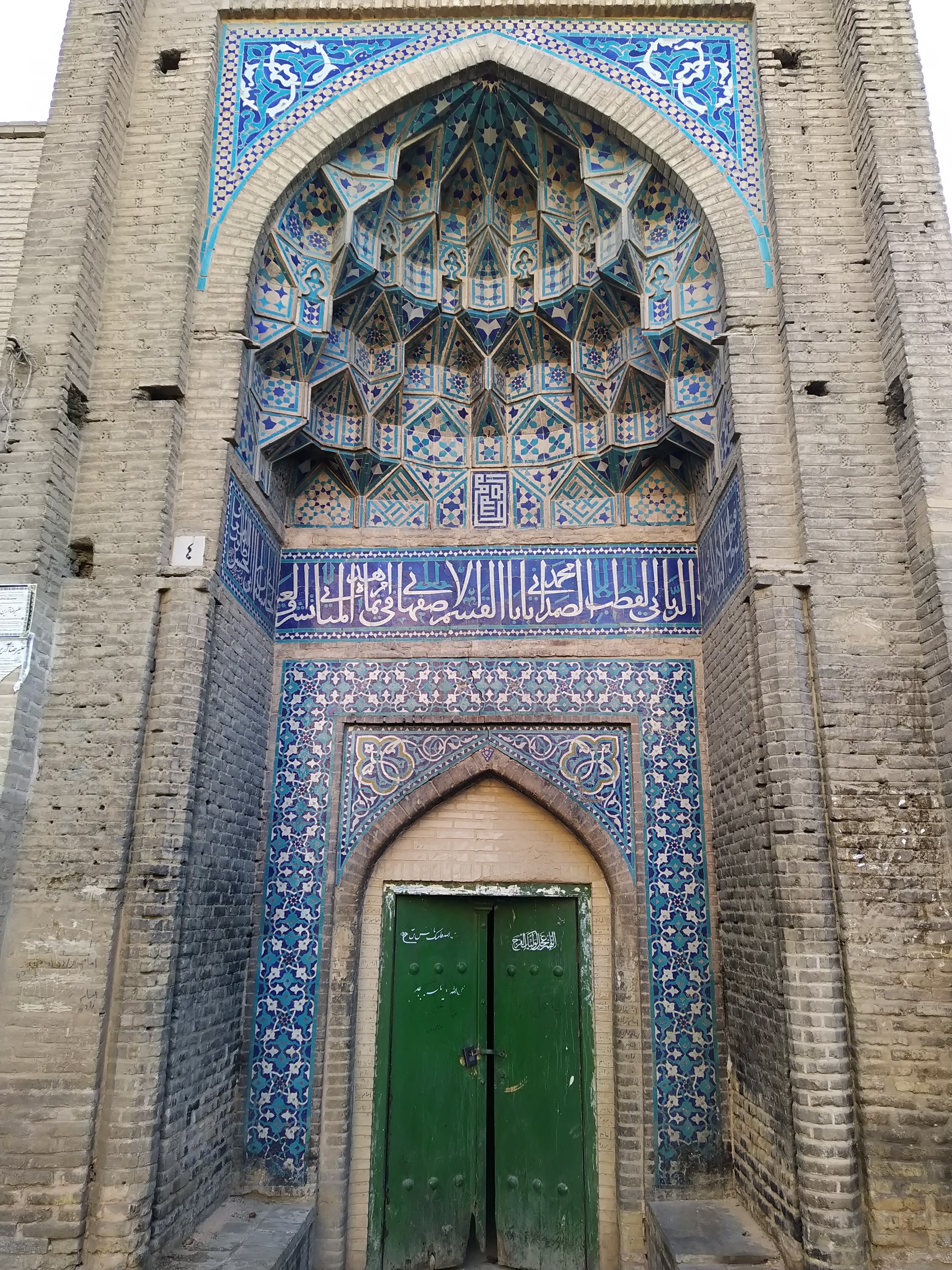
Entrance to the mausoleum

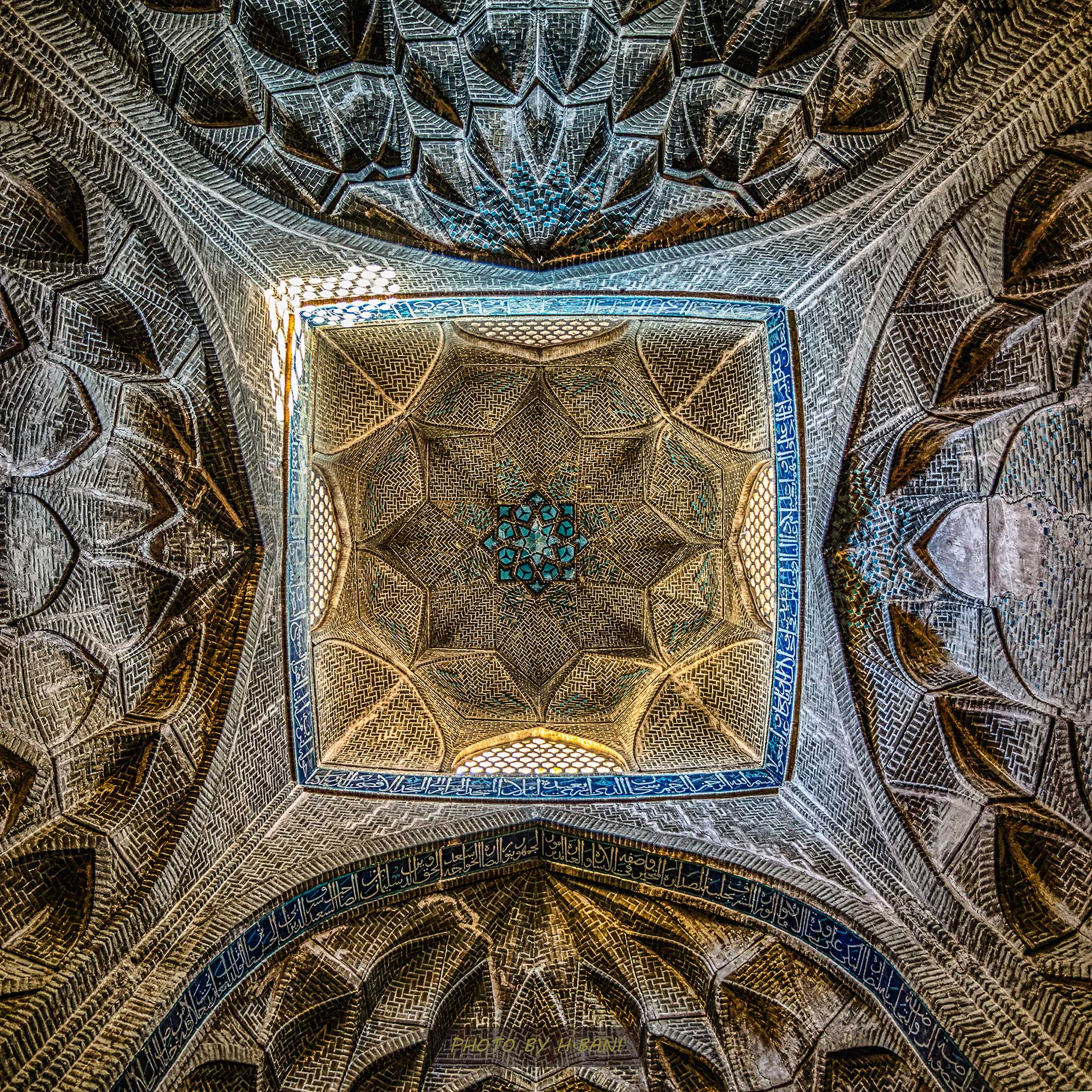
The inside of the dome

== See also ==
- List of historical structures in Isfahan province
- List of mausoleums in Iran
