= Mausoleum of Safavid Princes =

Twelver Shi'ite mausoleum in Isfahan, Iran

- آرامگاه ستی فاطمه
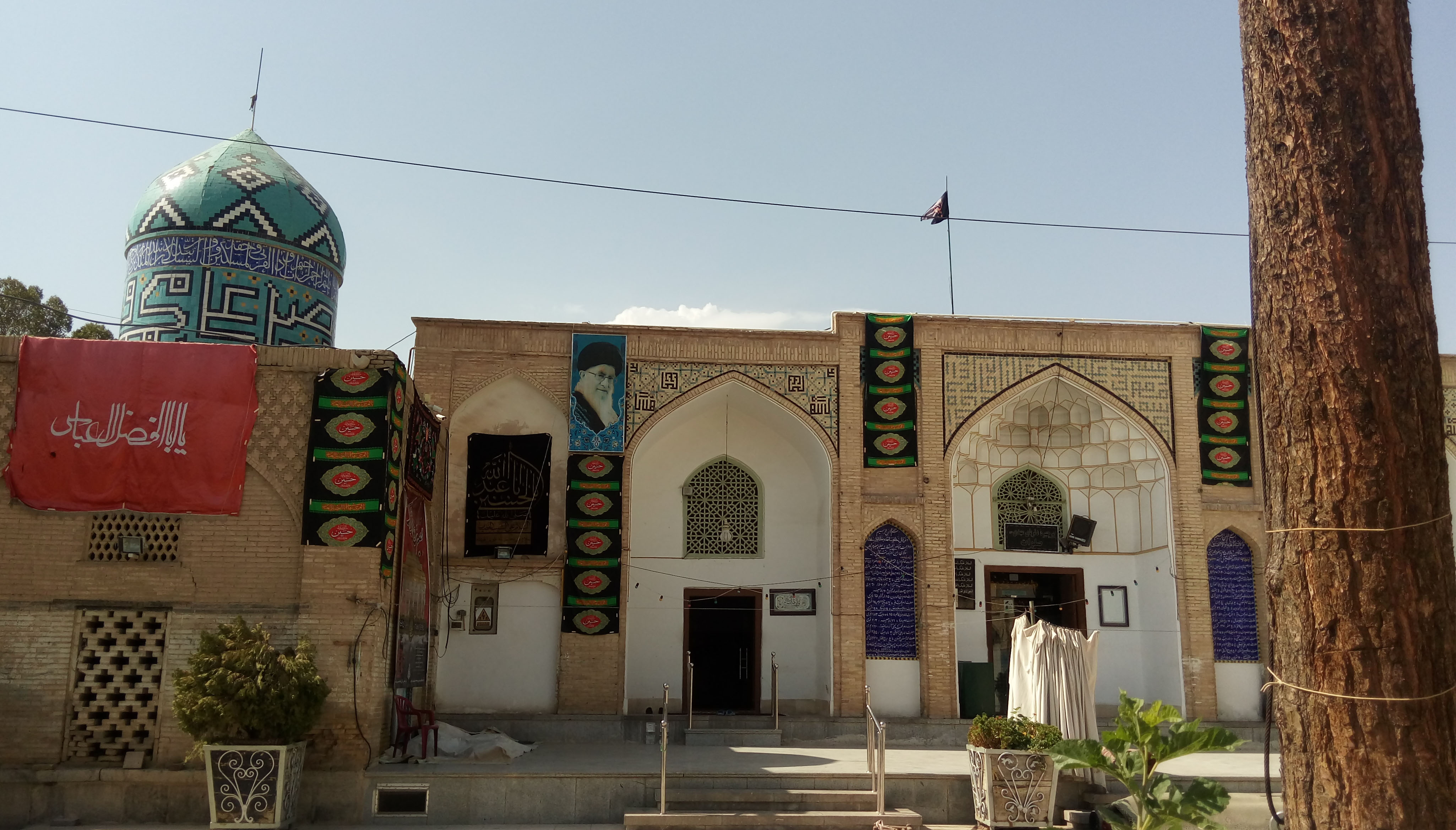
- The complex in 2018

- Location of the complex in Iran

Religion
- Affiliation: Shia (Twelver)
- Ecclesiastical or organisational status: Mausoleum
- Status: Active

Location
- Location: Chaharsu-ye-Kuchak, Isfahan, Isfahan province, Iran
- Country: Iran
- Interactive map of Mausoleum of Safavid Princes
- Coordinates: 32°39′37″N 51°39′13″E

Architecture
- Type: Islamic architecture
- Style: Safavid; Qajar
- Completed: 1632 CE

Specifications
- Length: 24 m (79 ft)
- Width: 8.14 m (26.7 ft)
- Dome: One
- Dome dia. (inner): One
- Materials: Bricks; adobe; mud; plaster; tiles

Iran National Heritage List
- Official name: Mausoleum of Seti Fatemeh
- Type: Mausoleum
- Designated: 1934
- Reference no.: 222
- Conservation organization: Cultural Heritage, Handicrafts and Tourism Organization of Iran

The Mausoleum of Safavid Princes (Persian: آرامگاه ستی فاطمه), also known as the Mausoleum of Seti Fatemeh, is Twelver Shi'ite mausoleum and funerary complex, located in the Chaharsu-ye-Kuchak district of Isfahan, Iran. The mausoleum, completed in 1632 CE, entombs the remains of some of the great-grandsons of Safavid ruler, Shah Ismail I who were executed during the reign of Shah Safi.

The complex was added to the Iran National Heritage List on 13 December 1934, administered by the Ministry of Cultural Heritage, Tourism and Handicrafts.

== History ==
When Sam Mirza came to power as the new Shah of Iran and took the royal title of Shah Safi, he ruthlessly eliminated anyone he regarded as a threat to his power, executing almost all of the Safavid royal princes. Some of these murdered or executed princes were entombed between the years 1631 to 1632 at the spot where the mausoleum is now. The mausoleum was renovated in 1826 during the reign of Fath-Ali Shah Qajar. An inscribed poem, dating back to the same year, reveals a name of a "Mohammad Ali Khan" who was responsible for the renovations.

== Tomb of Seti Fateme ==
On the west of the mausoleum is the Tomb of Seti Fateme (Persian: آرامگاه ستی فاطمه) which is believed to contain the grave of Siti Fatimah, a daughter of the seventh Imam of Ahlulbayt, Musa al-Kazim. This building dates to the reign of Abbas the Great. Despite the attribution, there is no historical evidence that a daughter of Musa al-Kazim was buried there, nor is there any proof for her existence. There is a private mausoleum for the influential families of Soltan Khalifa and Sadat Marashi in this area as well.

== Gallery ==
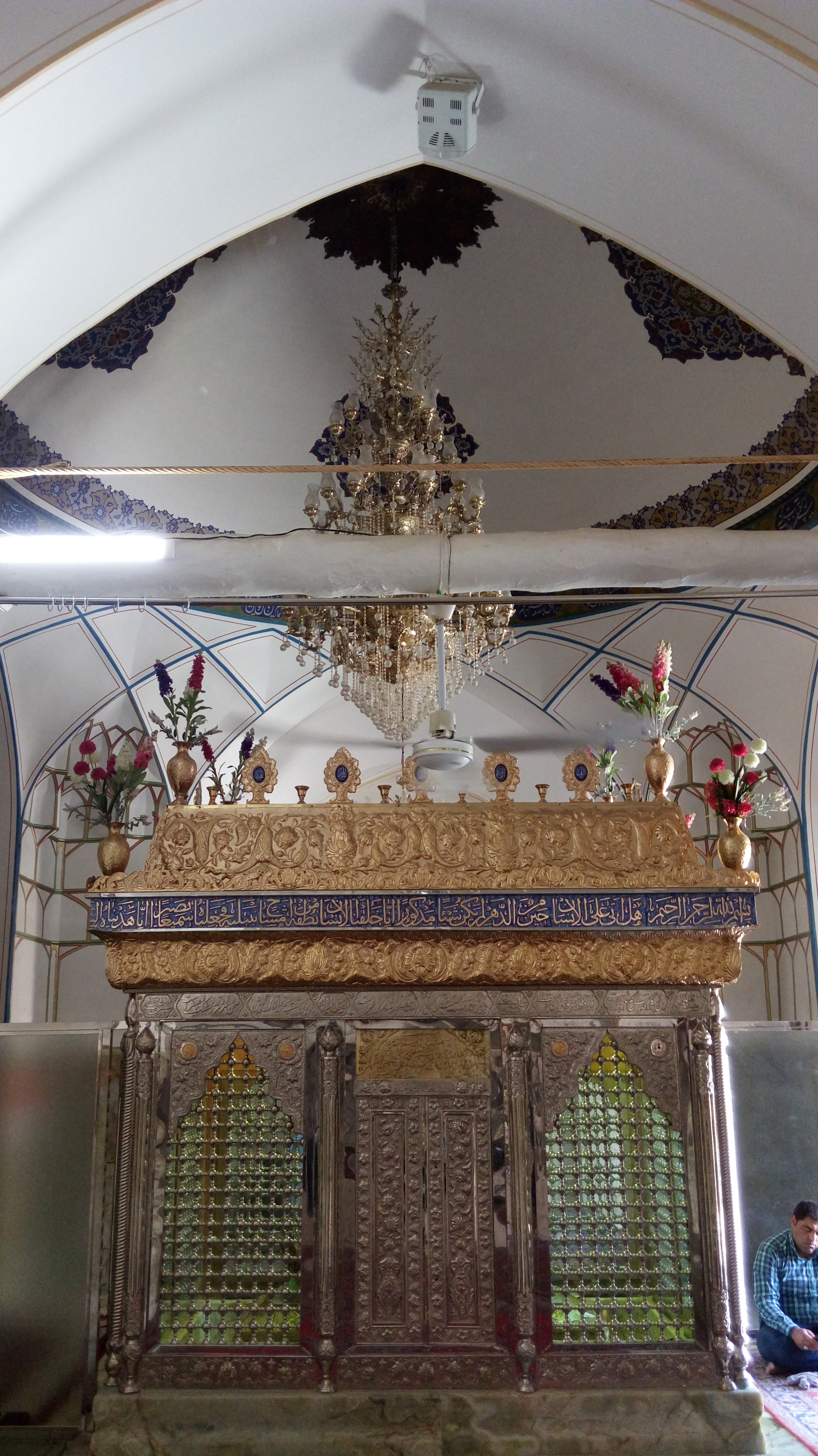
Inside the tomb of Seti Fateme

== See also ==
- List of historical structures in Isfahan
- List of mausoleums in Iran
- Shia Islam in Iran
