= Tomb of Bibi Dokhtaran =

Mausoleum in Shiraz, Iran

- آرامگاه بی‌بی دختران
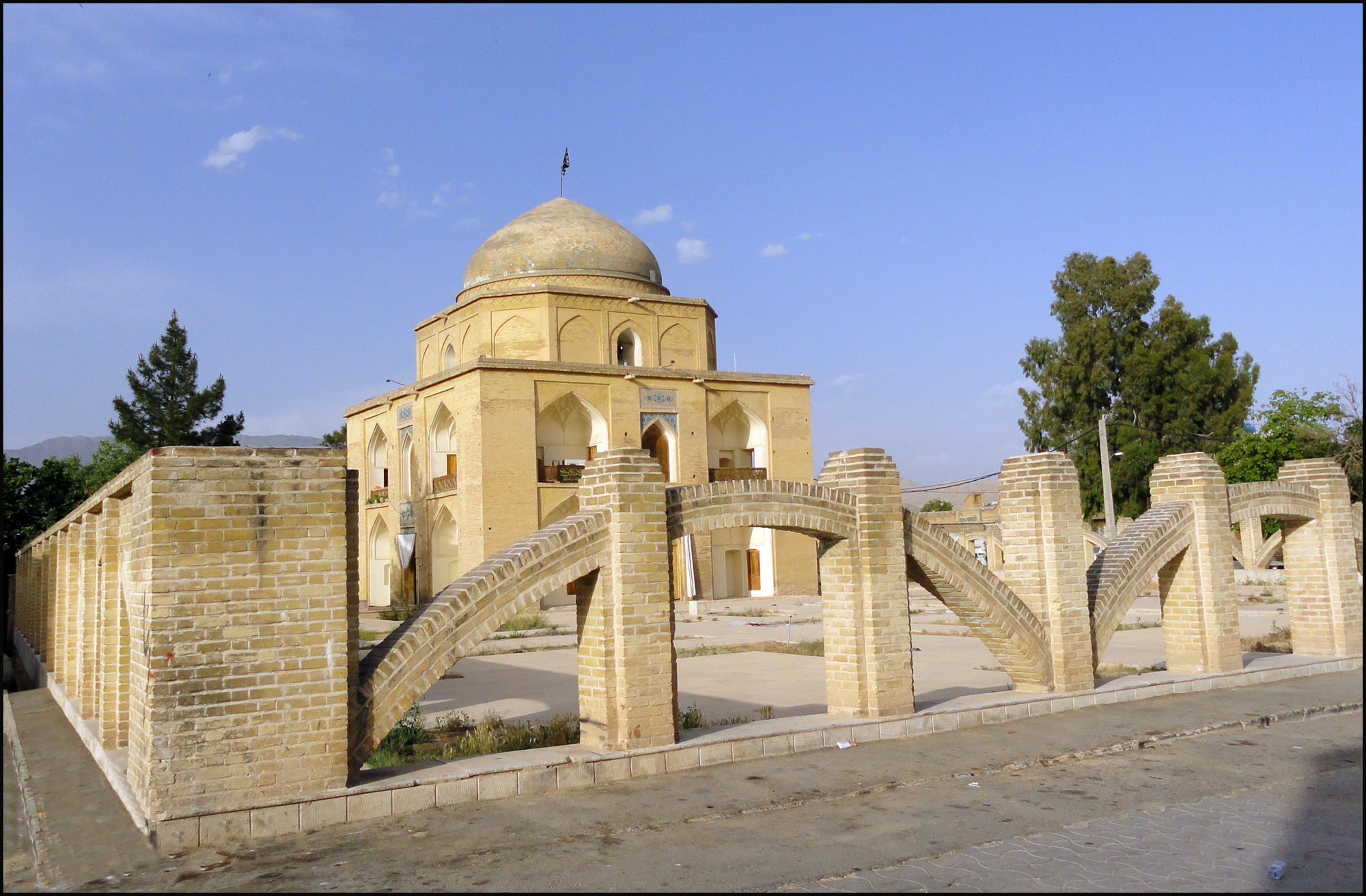

- Location of the complex in Iran

Religion
- Affiliation: Islam
- Ecclesiastical or organizational status: Mausoleum
- Status: Active

Location
- Location: Shiraz, Fars province
- Country: Iran
- Interactive map of Tomb of Bibi Dokhtaran
- Coordinates: 29°36′47″N 52°32′20″E

Architecture
- Type: Islamic architecture
- Style: Ilkhanid

Specifications
- Dome: One
- Shrine: One: Om-e-Abdollah
- Materials: Bricks; plaster; tiles

Iran National Heritage List
- Official name: Tomb of Bibi Dokhtaran
- Type: Built
- Designated: 12 July 1968
- Reference no.: 422
- Conservation organization: Cultural Heritage, Handicrafts and Tourism Organization of Iran

The Tomb of Bibi Dokhtaran (Persian: آرامگاه بی‌بی دختران; Arabic: ضريح بيبي دتشتران), also known as the Bibi Dokhtaran Mausoleum, is a mausoleum located in Shiraz, in the province of Fars. Iran. The complex was built during the Ilkhanid era.

The complex was added to the Iran National Heritage List on 12 July 1968, administered by the Cultural Heritage, Handicrafts and Tourism Organization of Iran.

== See also ==
- List of mausoleums in Iran
- Islam in Iran
