= Tomb of Pir Palandouz =

Tomb or mausoleum in Mashhad, Razavi Khorasan, Iran

- آرامگاه پیر پالاندوز
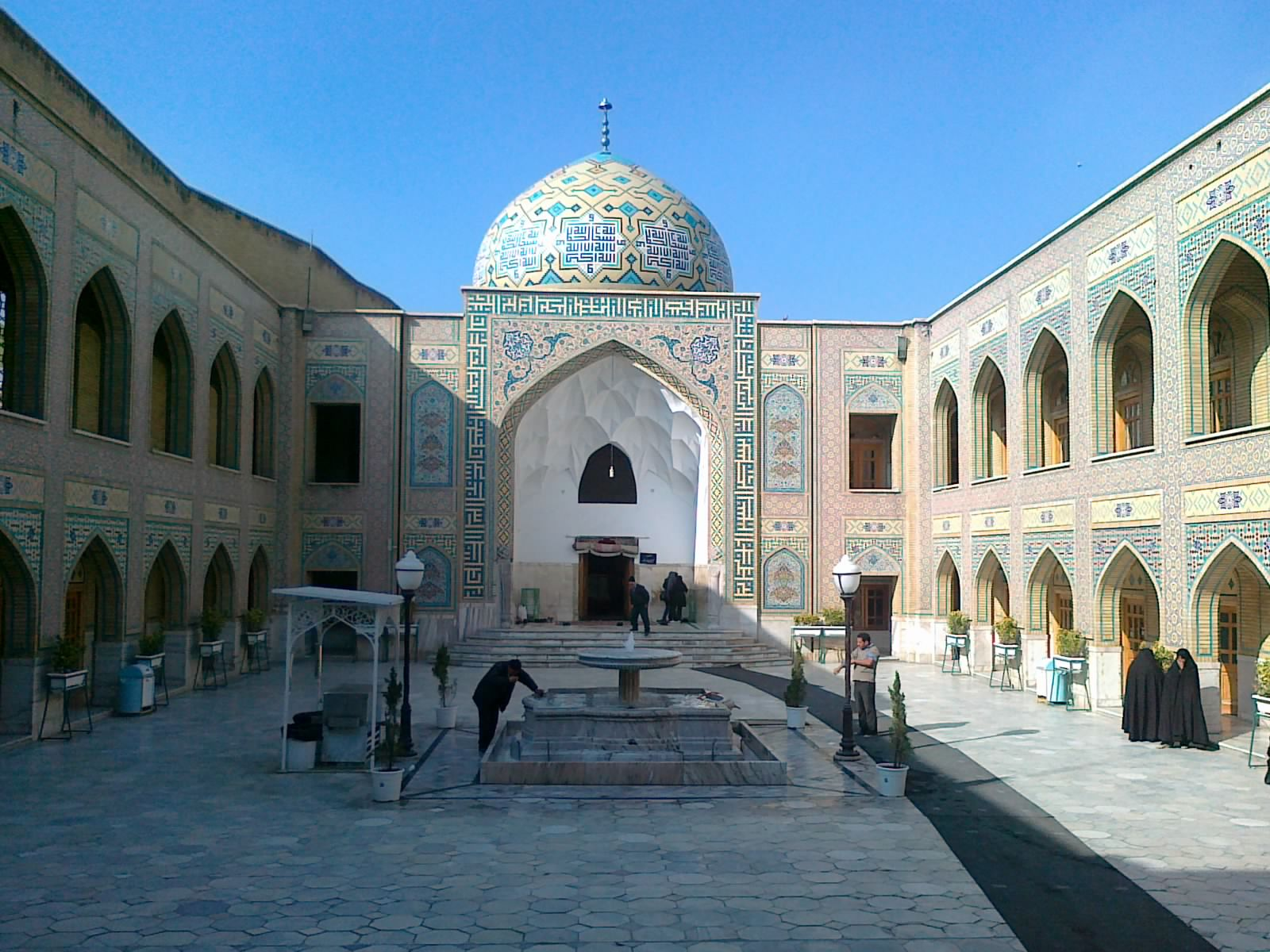
- The mausoleum complex in 2011

- Location of the complex in Iran

Religion
- Affiliation: Shia Islam
- Ecclesiastical or organizational status: Mausoleum and tomb
- Status: Active

Location
- Location: Mashhad, Razavi Khorasan province
- Country: Iran
- Interactive map of Tomb of Pir Palandouz
- Coordinates: 36°17′13″N 59°37′9″E

Architecture
- Type: Islamic architecture
- Style: Safavid
- Completed: 1577 CE

Specifications
- Dome: One
- Shrine: One: Pir Palandouz
- Materials: Bricks; mortar

Iran National Heritage List
- Official name: Tomb of Pir Palandouz
- Type: Built
- Designated: 25 April 1977
- Reference no.: 1375
- Conservation organization: Cultural Heritage, Handicrafts and Tourism Organization of Iran

The Tomb of Pir Palandouz (Persian: آرامگاه پیر پالاندوز; Arabic: ضريح بير بالاندوز) is a mausoleum and tomb complex, located in Mashhad, in the province of Razavi Khorasan, Iran. The complex was completed in 1577 CE, during the Safavid era.

The complex was added to the Iran National Heritage List on 25 April 1977, administered by the Cultural Heritage, Handicrafts and Tourism Organization of Iran.

== Gallery ==
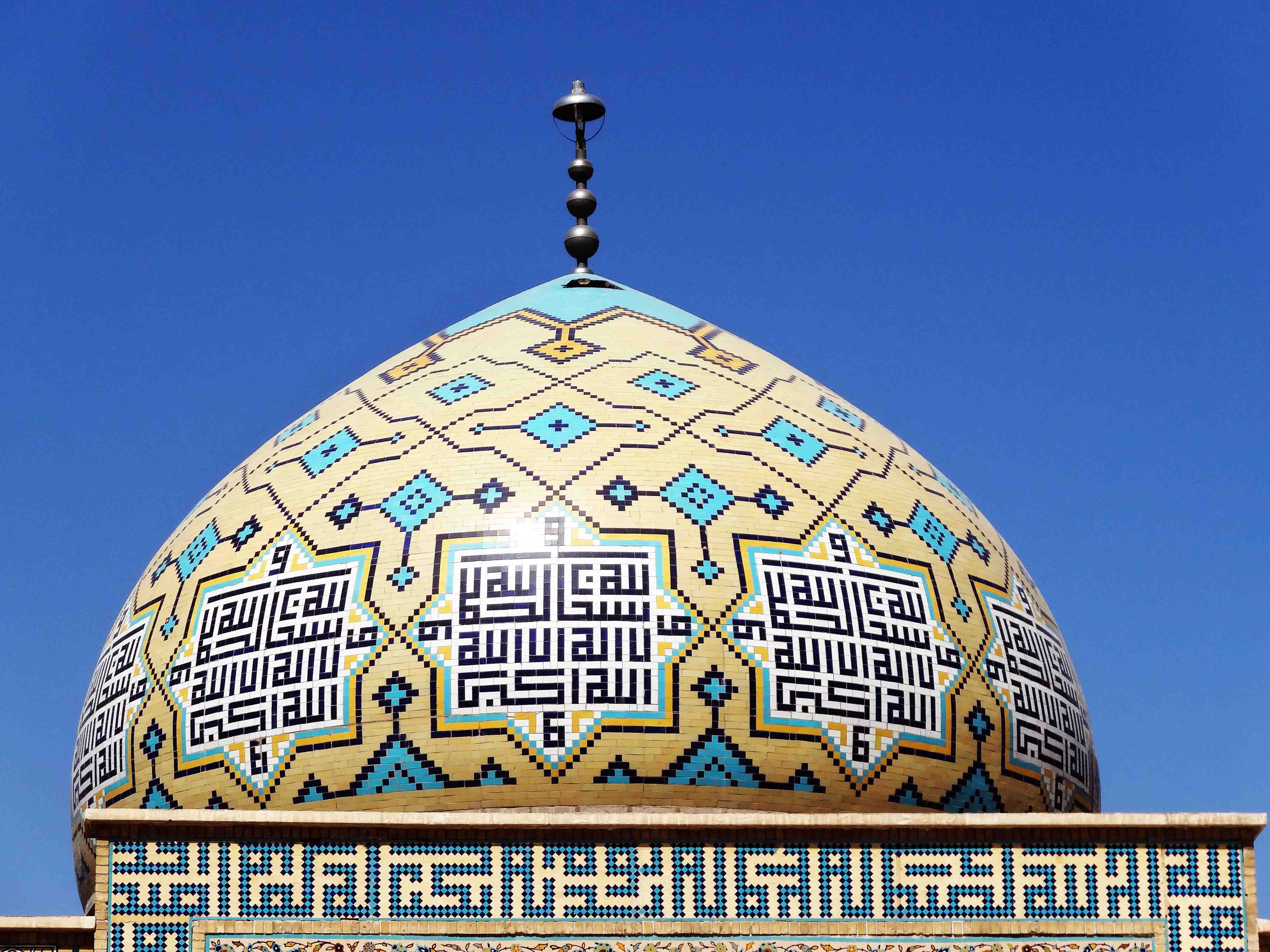
Dome exterior

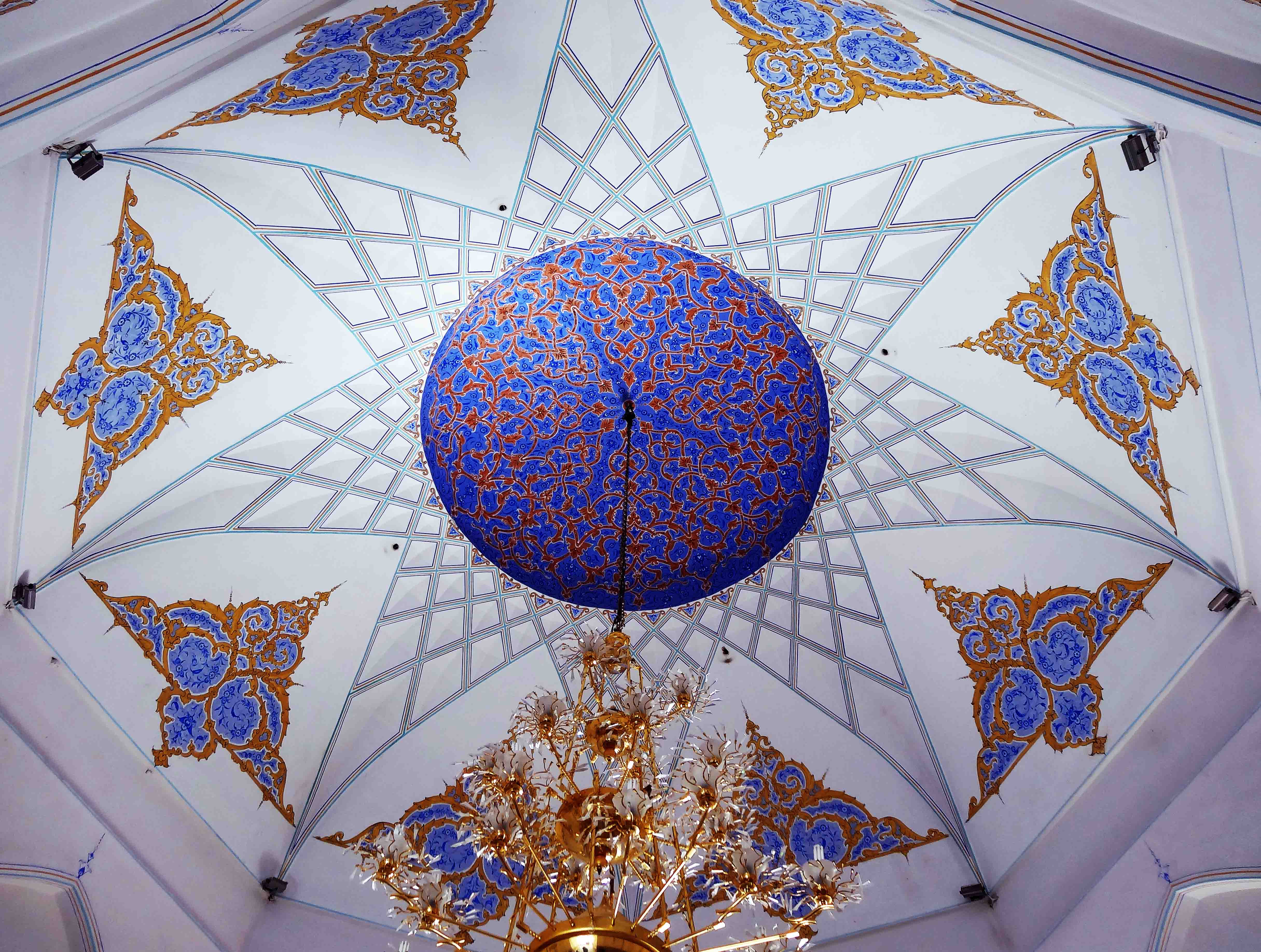
Dome interior

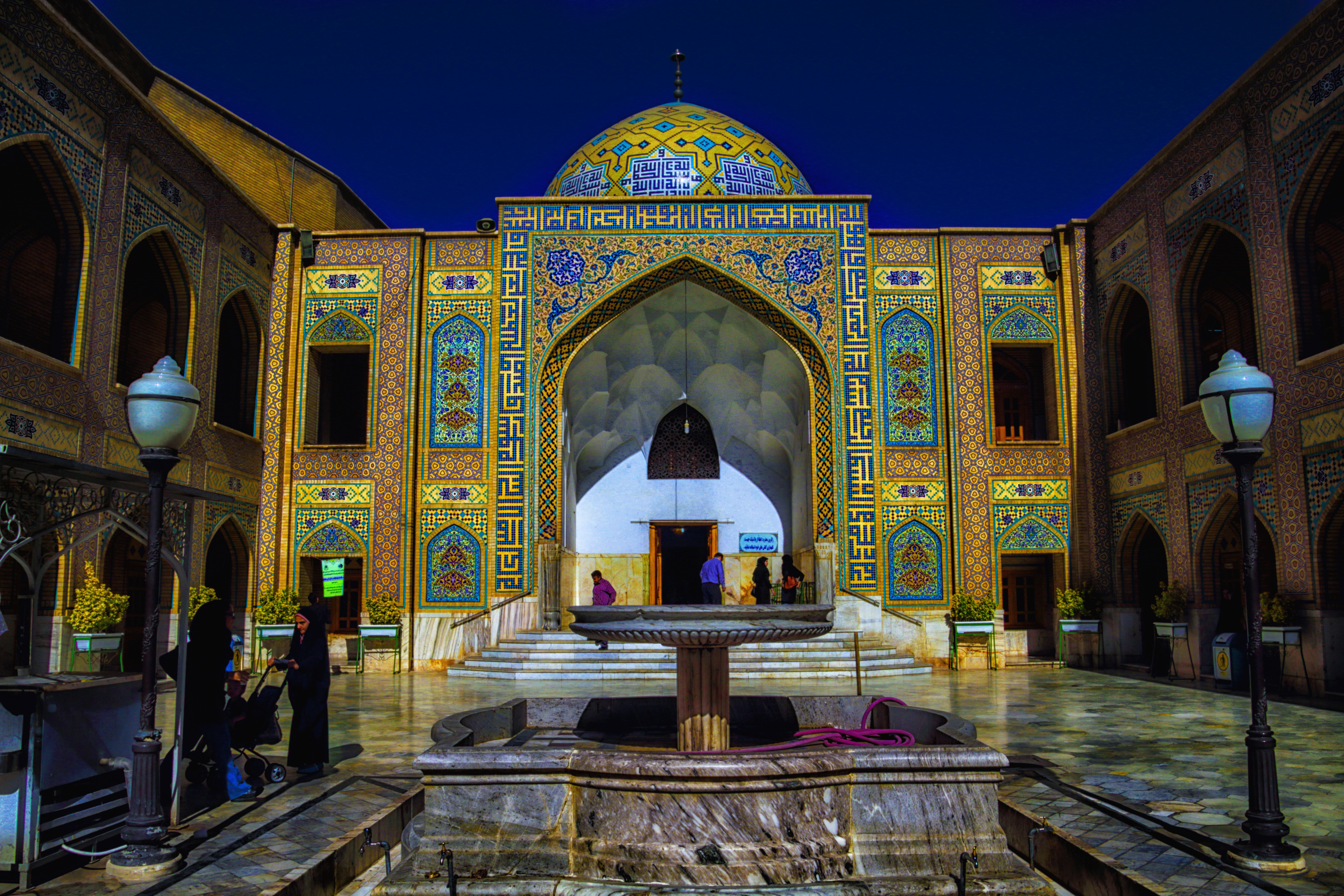
Sahn, fountain and iwan

== See also ==
- List of mausoleums in Iran
- Shia Islam in Iran
