= Monar Jonban =

Mosque in Isfahan, Iran

Menar Jonban
- منارجنبان
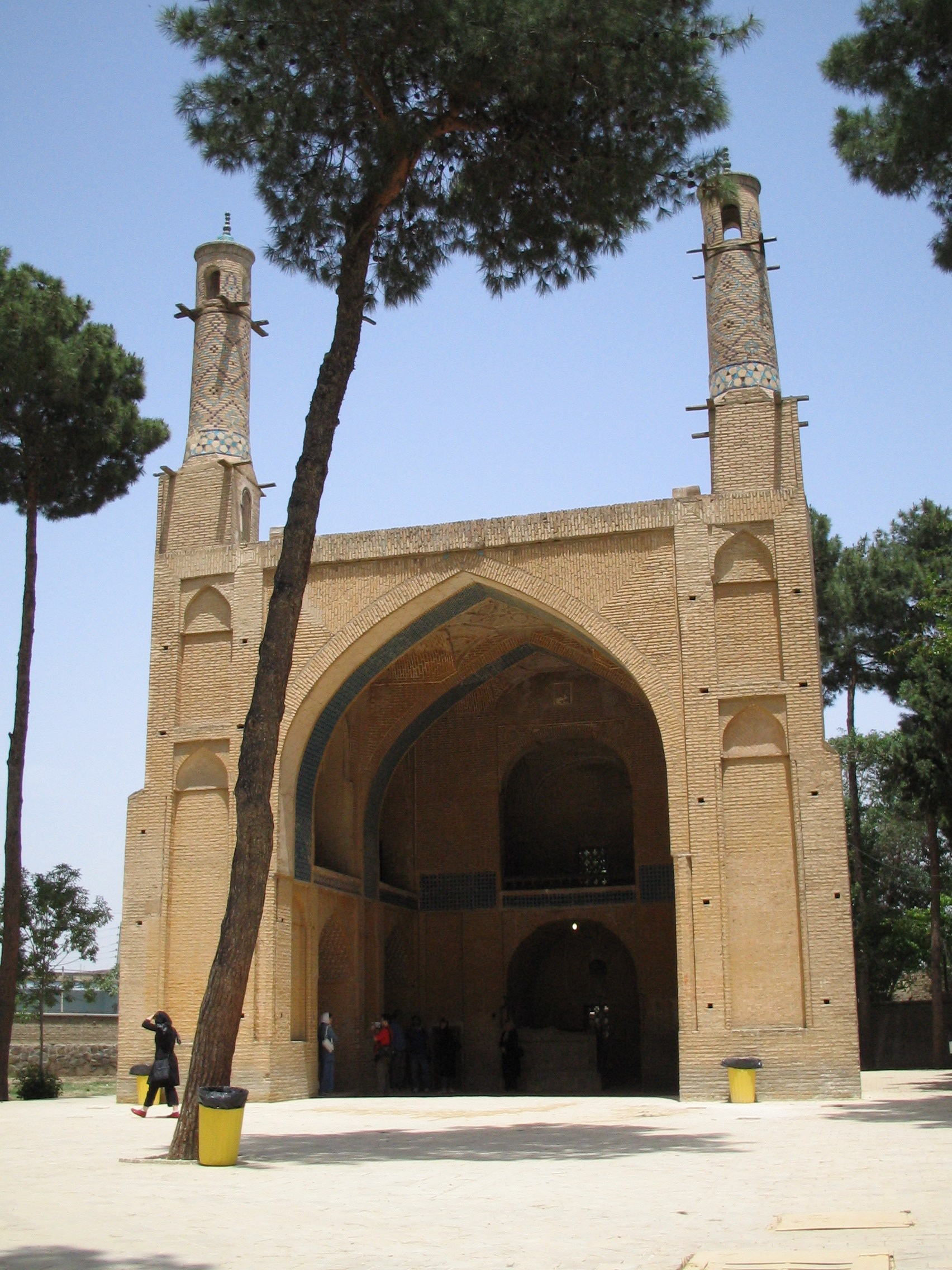
- The mausoleum in 2005

- Location of the mausoleum in Iran

Religion
- Affiliation: Shia Islam
- Ecclesiastical or organisational status: Mosque and mausoleum
- Status: Active

Location
- Location: Esfahan, Isfahan Province
- Country: Iran
- Coordinates: 32°39′2″N 51°35′39″E

Architecture
- Architect: Baha' al-din al-'Amili
- Type: Mosque architecture
- Style: Ilkhanid / Safavid
- Founder: Öljaitü
- Completed: 1316 CE (tomb); 14th–15th century (mausoleum)

Specifications
- Length: 13.6 m (45 ft)
- Width: 13 m (43 ft)
- Minaret: Two
- Minaret height: 17.5 m (57 ft)
- Materials: Bricks; mortar; timber; tiles

Iran National Heritage List
- Official name: Menar Jonban
- Type: Mausoleum
- Designated: 1942
- Reference no.: 349
- Conservation organization: Cultural Heritage, Handicrafts and Tourism Organization of Iran

The Menar Jonban (Persian: منار جنبان, romanized: Menar-e-jomban, lit. 'Shaking Minarets'), is a mosque and mausoleum, located in Esfahan, in the province of Isfahan, Iran.

It was intended as a shrine, built over the grave of the Sufi ascetic Amu Abdullah Suqla. Construction started in the Ilkhanate era and it was finished during the Safavid era. The most notable feature of the building are its two minarets, that both shake and sway when one of them is shaken.

The structure was added to the Iran National Heritage List on 10 June 1942, administered by the Cultural Heritage, Handicrafts and Tourism Organization of Iran.

== History ==
A shrine over the grave of the ascetic Abdullah ibn Muhammad was constructed in 1316 CE by Öljaitü. The building was renovated by Safavid Iran and was ultimately completed by the architect and Twelver Shi'a scholar Baha al-Din al-Amili. The structure had no minarets at first; the twin minarets were added by the Safavids. A cemetery used to surround the building as well.

== Architecture ==
The building is decorated with blue tiles and multi-sided turquoise stones. The general outlook of the building displays the style of Mongolian masonry, but Safavid influence is present in the iwan of the building and the minarets. Bricks with higher rates of elasticity were used in the construction.

The twin minarets are 17.5 metres (57 ft) tall. Each of them are topped with a blue onion dome. They are accessible via a staircase, which is no longer permitted and only the caretaker can access it for shaking them. The graves of Amu Abdullah and another personality are inside the building, at the very end.

The Monar Jonban includes two small rooms, that were known as 'Chelah Khanah' during the time of its construction. Both rooms were used by ascetics and mystics to indulge in their rituals and stay in their seclusion.

=== The shaking minarets ===
The building's name, Monar Jonban, is derived from the pair of minarets, which shake in harmony with each other when one of them is shaken. This structural phenomenon and marvel , however, is apparently not available to the public, but they can witness it at certain times. https://www.tehrantimes.com/news/454219/Menar-Jonban-they-really-shake

== Gallery ==
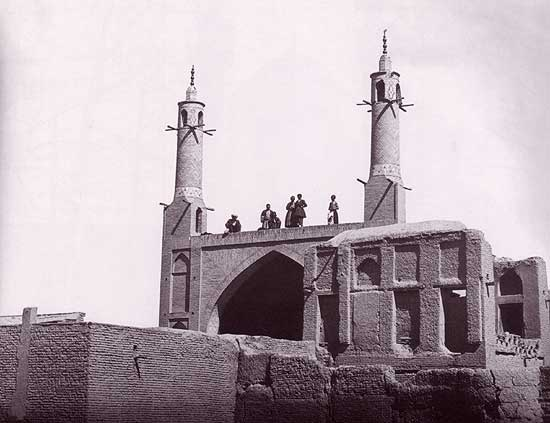
Monar Jonban in 1873 CE

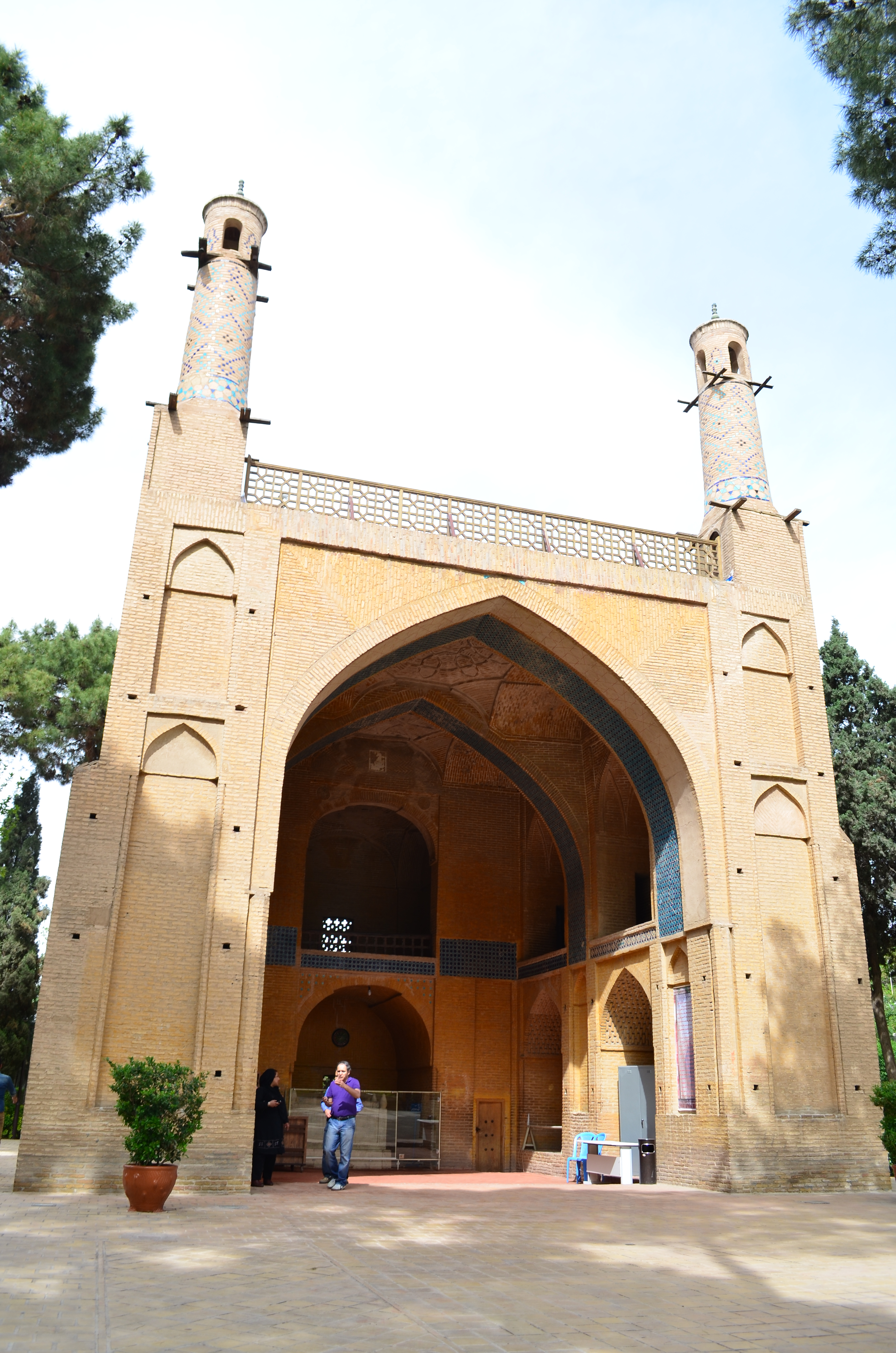
Front view

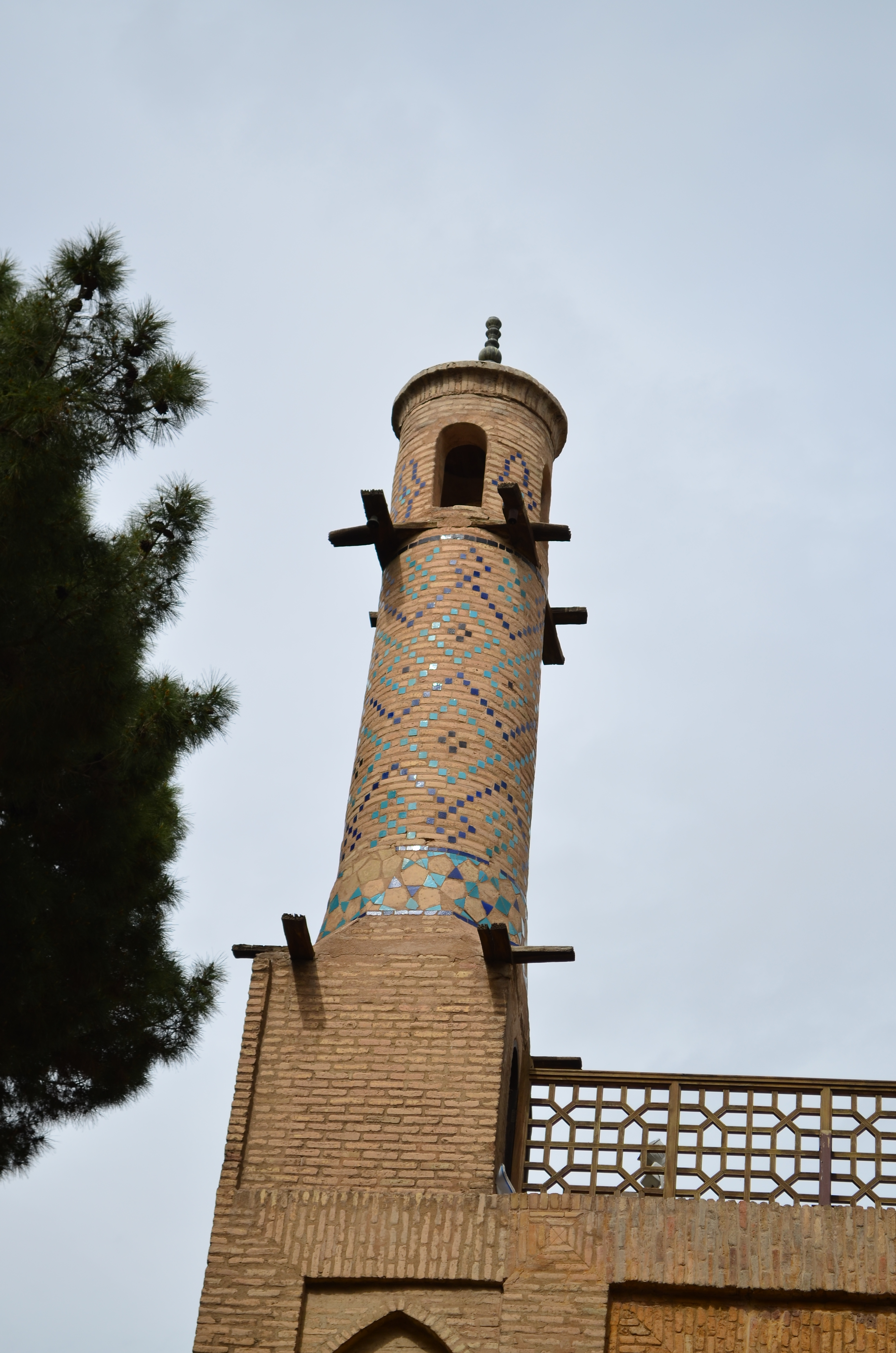
A near view of the left minaret

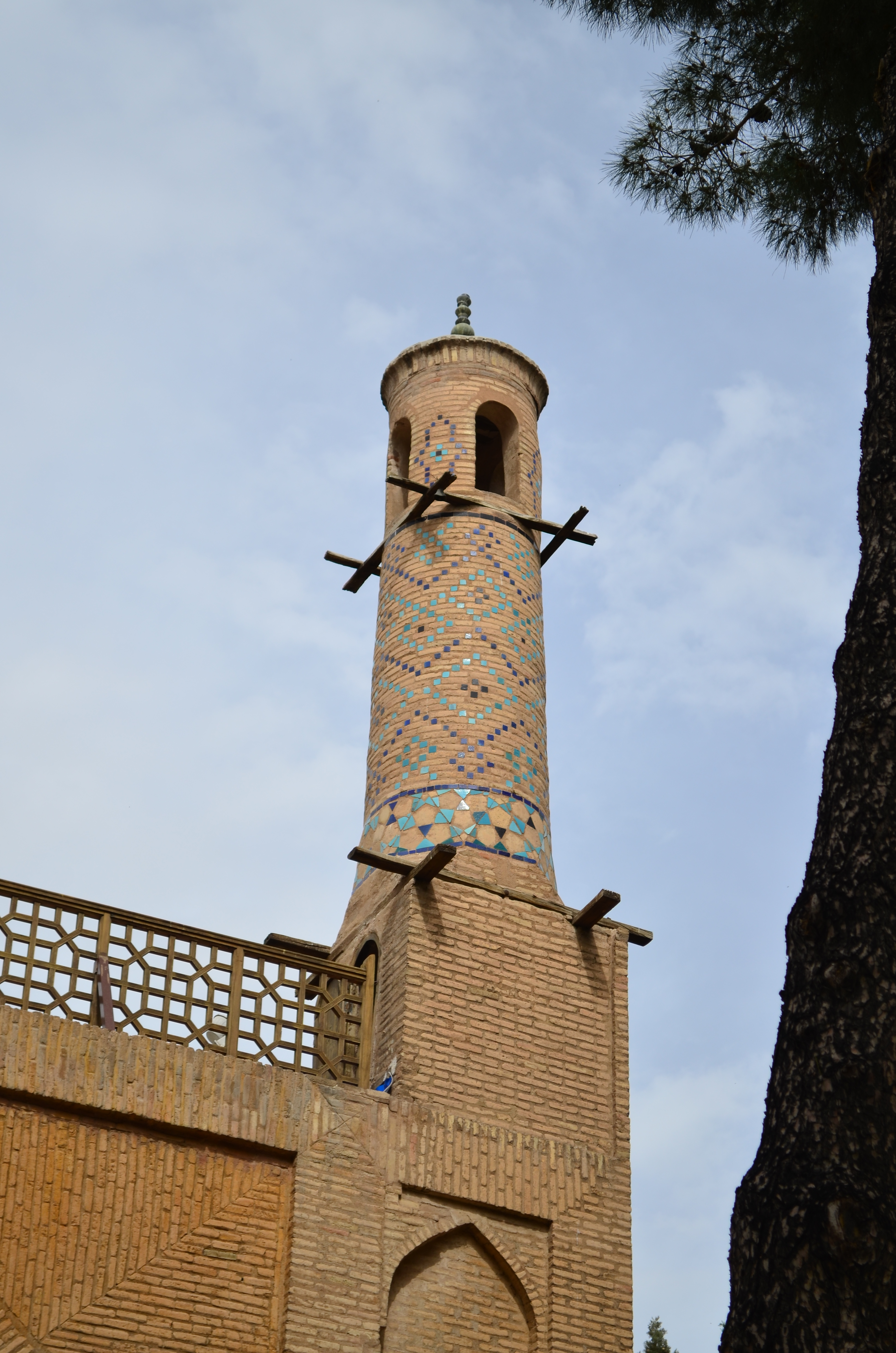
A near view of the right minaret

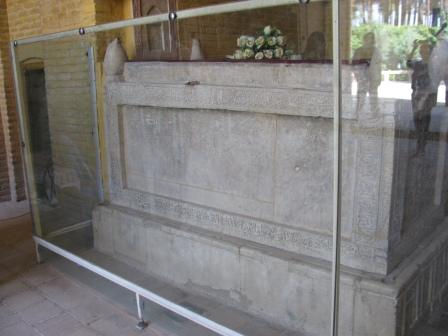
The tomb of Amu Abdullah Suqla al-Karladani within the Monar Jonban

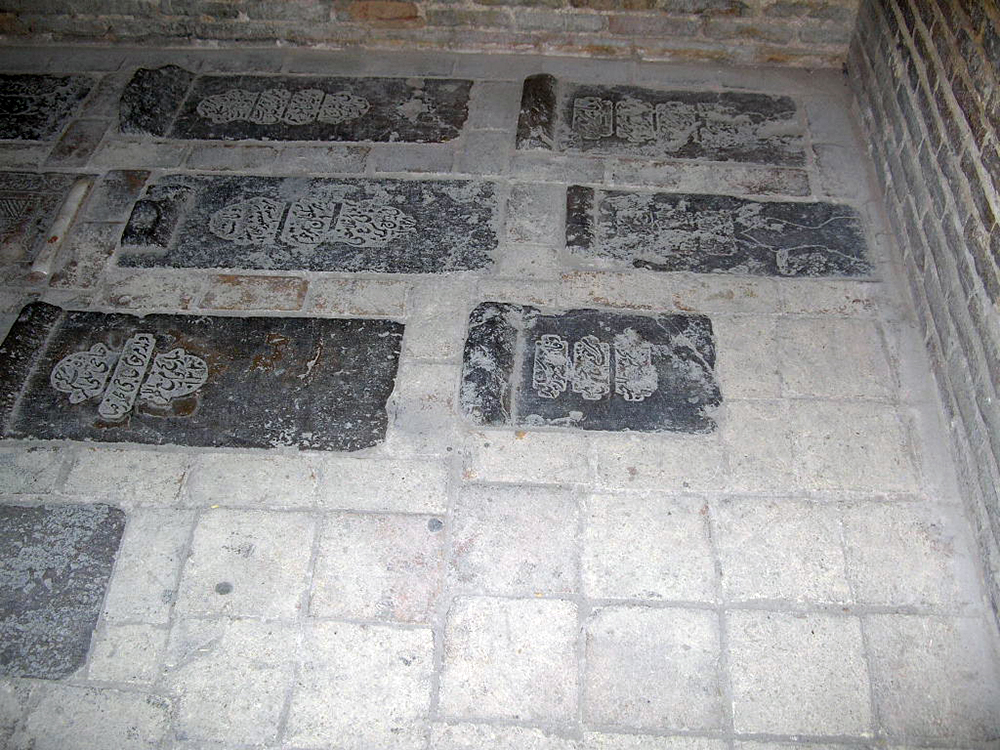
Some old graves, plastered over with cement tombstones, next to the tomb of Amu Abdullah Suqla

== See also ==
- Shia Islam in Iran
- List of mosques in Iran
- List of mausoleums in Iran
