= Eynali =

Mountain range in Iran

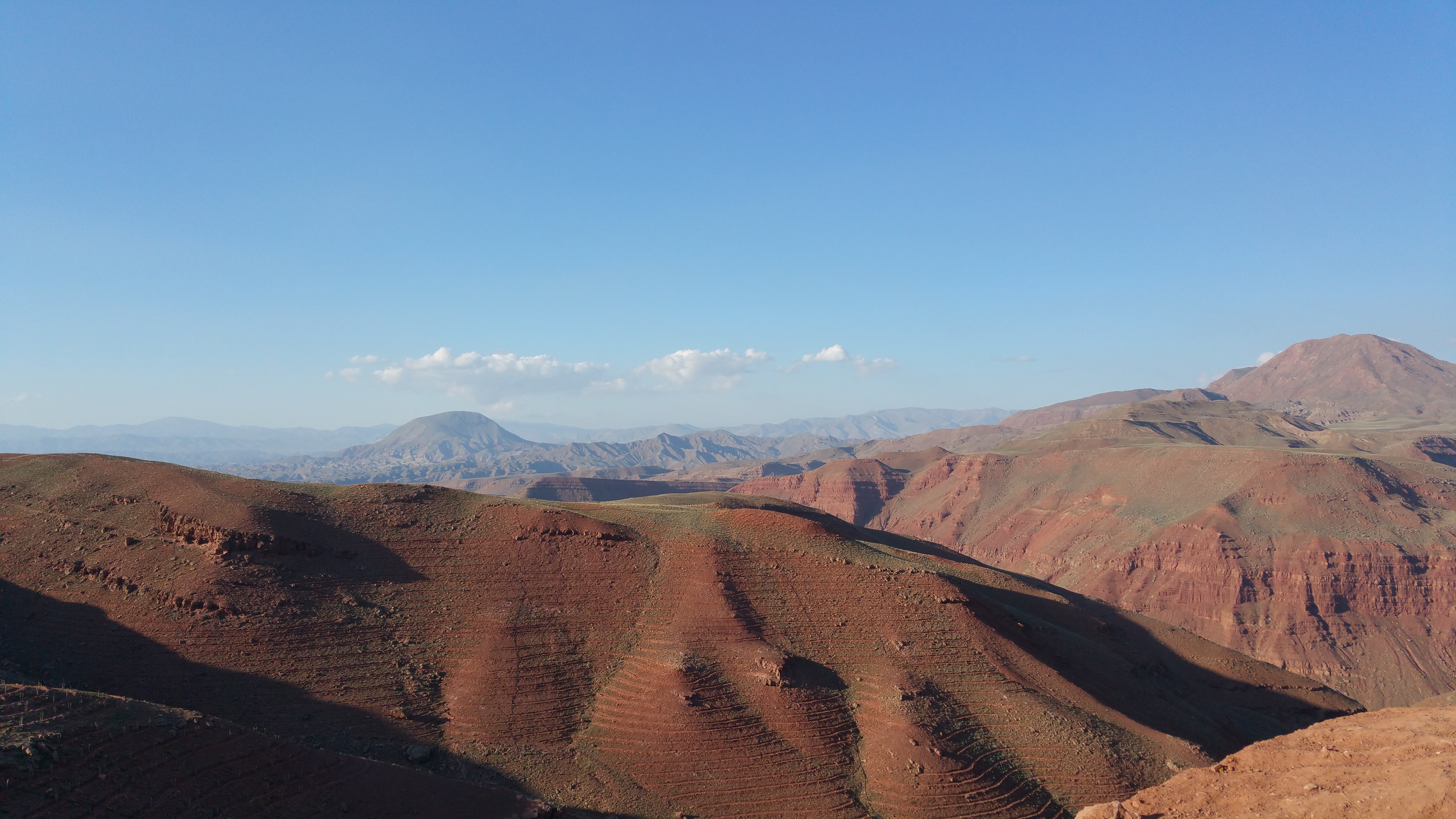
- A view from station 1.

Highest point
- Elevation: 1,800 m (5,900 ft)(Eynali peak); 2,378 m (7,802 ft) (Dand peak)
- Coordinates: 38°06′20″N 46°19′20″E

Geography
- Location: Tabriz, Iran

Geology
- Last eruption: Unknown

Climbing
- Easiest route: The pavement trail, 2 miles (3.3 km) to Eynali peak.

Eynali (Persian: عینالی), or On ibn Ali (عون بن علی), is a mountain range in north of Tabriz, Iran. The range has a couple of peaks including Eynali (1800 m), Halileh (1850 m), Pakeh-chin (1945 m), Bahlul (1985 m) and the highest one Dand (2378 m). There is a tomb at top of the mountain which is believed to be the grave of two clerics which the mountain's name is related to them. There is a belief among people that originally the building was a Zoroasterian temple or a Church that the shrine name to is a cover to saving the structure from destruction during Muslims invasion.

== Photo gallery ==
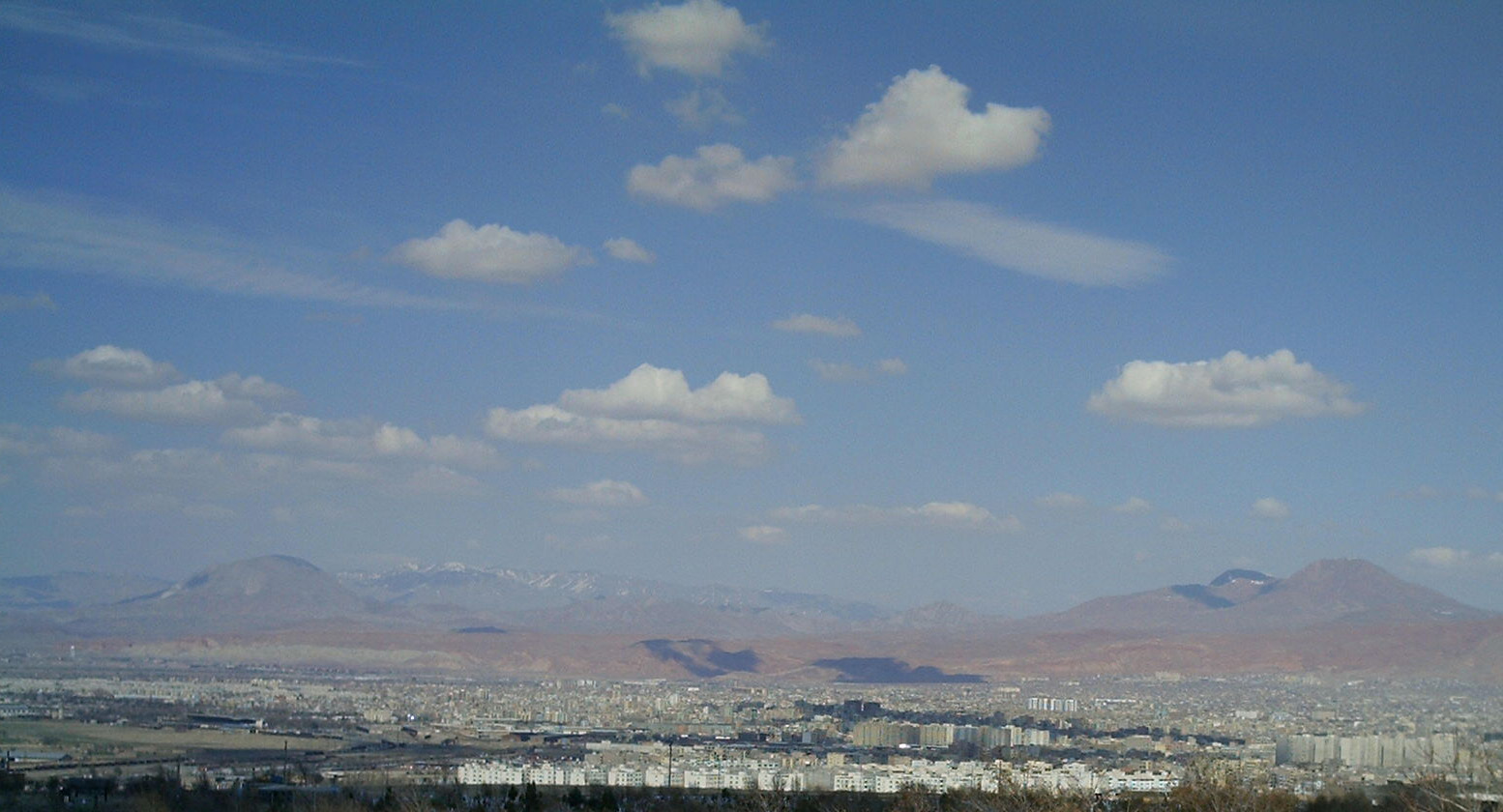
A view from the southern hills of Tabriz with Eynali is visible in North of Tabriz.

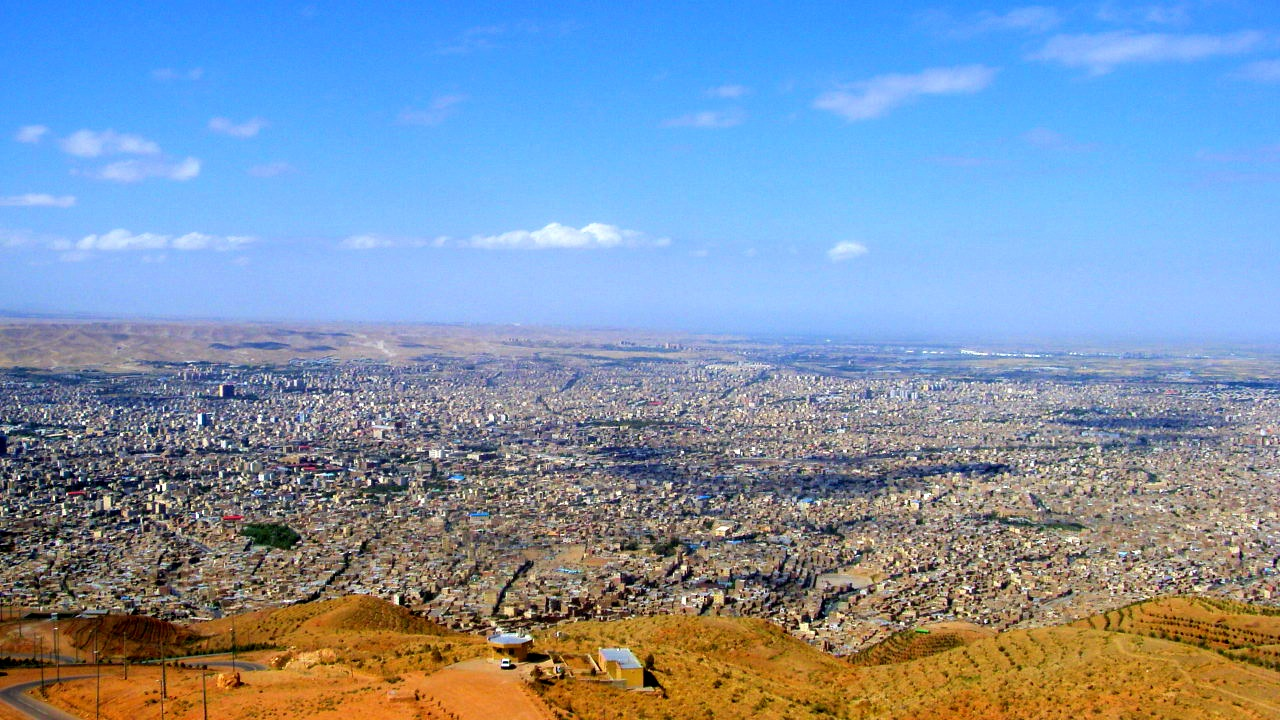
A view of Tabriz from Eynali foothills.

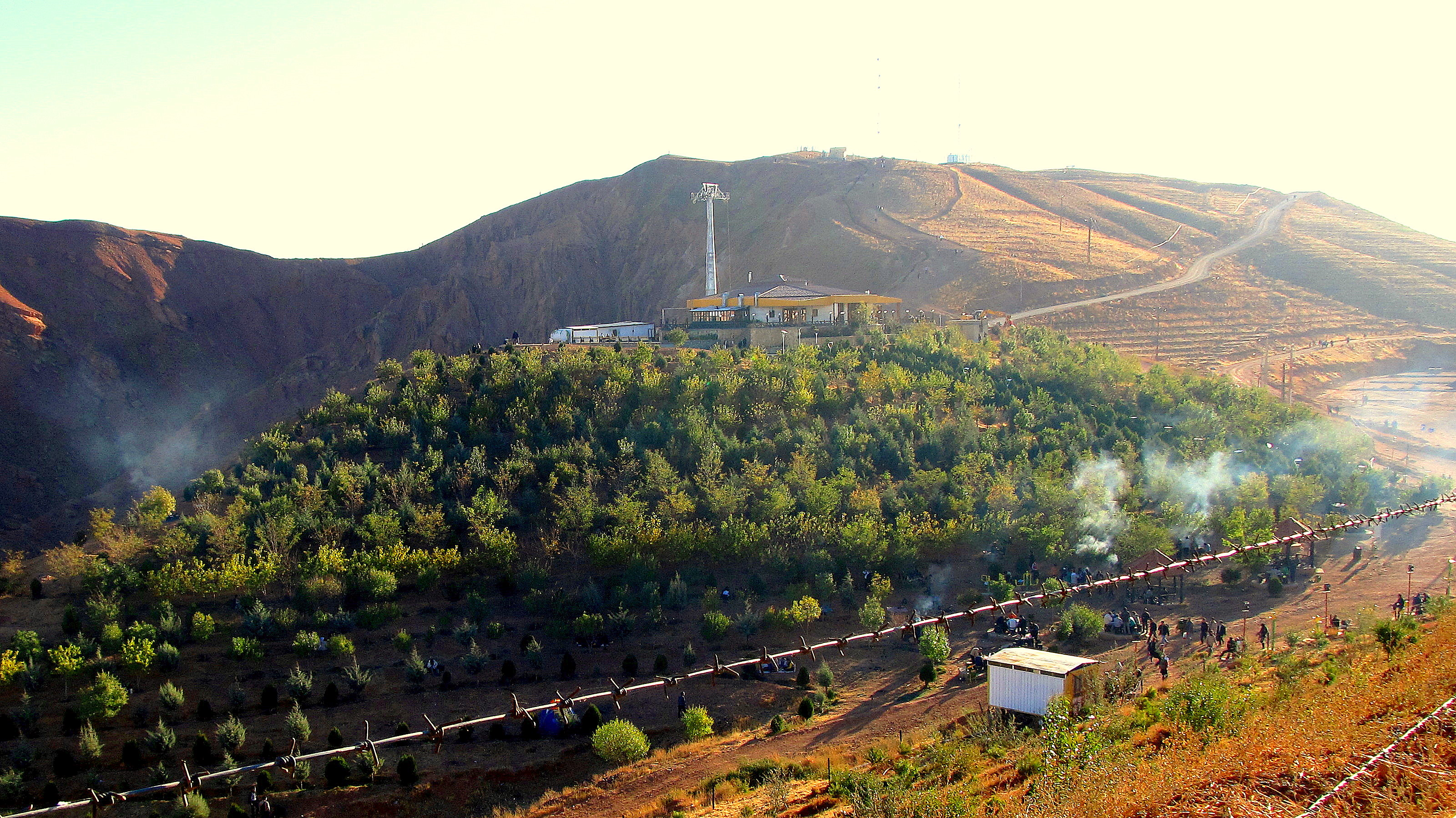
Artificial forest of Eynali.

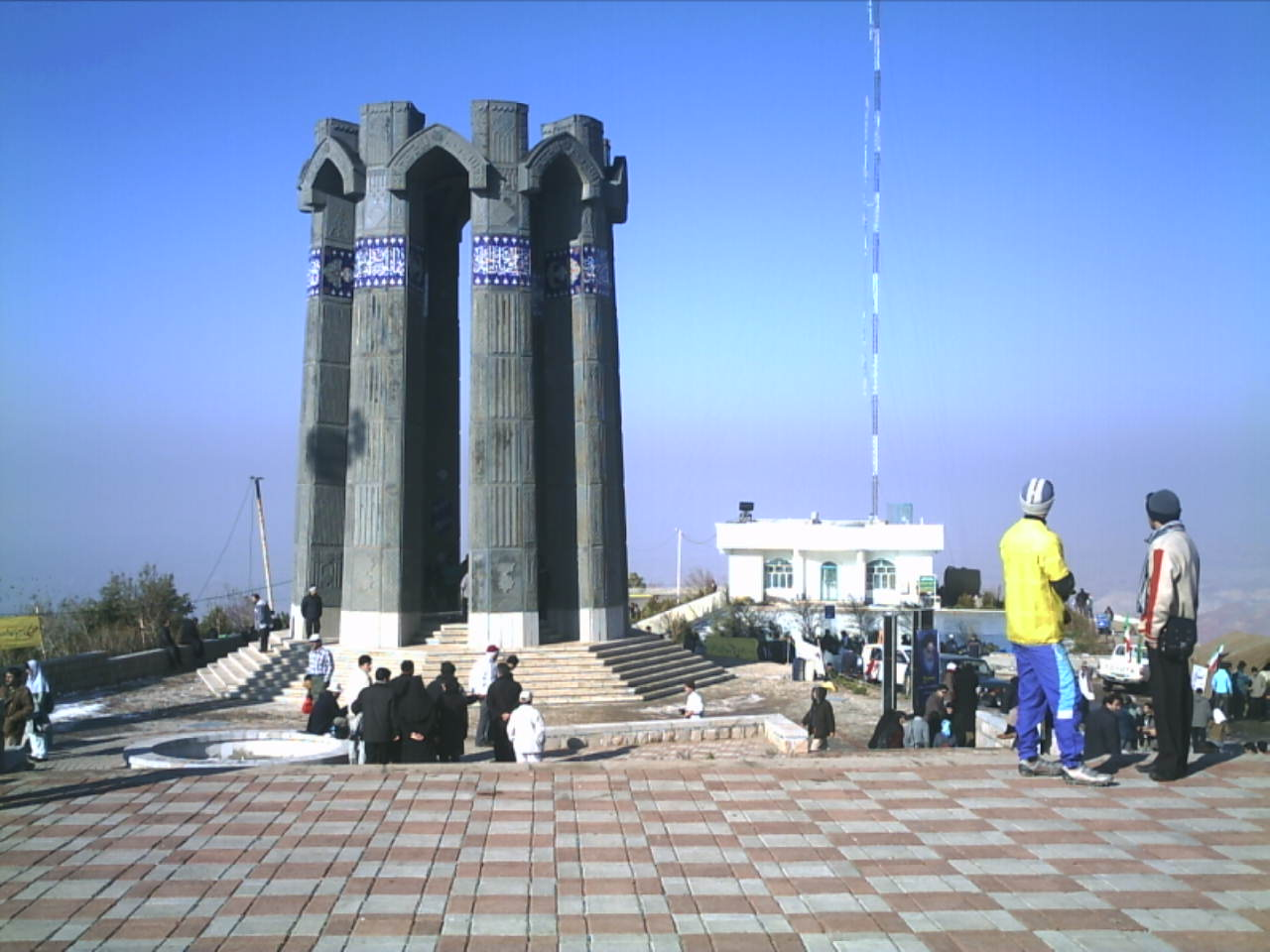
A memorial in Eynali, in memory of those who lost their life during the war.

== See also ==
- On ibn Ali's shrine
- Eynali Cable
