= 2006 Borujerd earthquake =

Earthquake in Iran

- Location within Iran
- UTC time: 2006-03-31 01:17:00
- ISC event: 10614039
- USGS-ANSS: ComCat
- Local date: 31 March 2006
- Local time: 04:47
- Magnitude: 6.1 M_{w}
- Depth: 7.0 km (4.3 mi)
- Epicenter: 33.56°N 48.73°E
- Type: Strike-slip
- Areas affected: Iran
- Total damage: $42.262 million / moderate
- Max. intensity: MMI VIII (Severe)
- Casualties: 63–70+ killed 1,246–1,418 injured

The 2006 Borujerd earthquake occurred in the early morning of 31 March in the South of Borujerd with destruction in Borujerd, Silakhor and Dorood areas of the Loristan Province in western Iran. The centre of the earthquake was in Darb-e Astaneh village south of the Borujerd City. The earthquake measured 6.1 on the moment magnitude scale.

== Earthquake ==
This powerful earthquake shook the entire land of Loristan Province and most areas of Hamedan and Markazi Provinces. More than 180 aftershocks followed the main earthquake in April, May and June and people had to stay outside for several weeks. A lighter foreshock happened the night before, and people stayed outside overnight and this reduced the number of casualties significantly. However, the mainshock at 4:47 am on 31 March shook Borujerd, Dorud and other towns and villages on Silakhor Plain for more than 55 seconds.

=== Damage ===
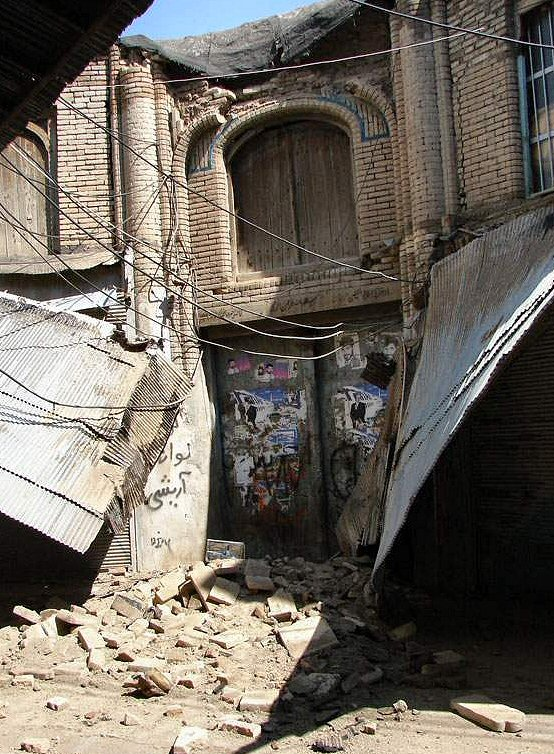
Damage to Carevanserai Hafezi in Bazaar of Borujerd

Across the affected region, 330 villages were severely damaged, including 70 which were completely razed, with a total of 31,080 houses affected by the earthquake. Over 15,000 families were displaced.

More than 40 major historical monuments of Borujerd were destroyed by the earthquake and 30% of the historical downtown of the city (2.7 kmª) was ruined or damaged thoroughly. Other monuments damaged by the earthquake include:

- Jame Mosque of Borujerd (900 AD)
- Soltani Mosque of Borujerd
- Imamzadeh Ja'far, Borujerd
- Chalenchoolan Bridge
- Ghaleh Hatam Bridge
- Birjandi Old House of Borujerd
- Mesri Old House of Borujerd
- Imamzadeh Khalogh Ali
- Tekyeh Movassaghi
- Pahlavei High School

=== Response ===
Apart from UN agencies e.g. UNESCO and UNICEF, there are other international agencies functioning in the field, including MSF, Caritas Italy, Operation Mercy, ACH Spain and ACT Netherlands.

== See also ==
- 1909 Borujerd earthquake
- List of earthquakes in 2006
- List of earthquakes in Iran
