= Ayatollah Boroujerdi University =

- Dāneshgāh-e Ayatollāh Boroūjerdi (دانشگاه آیت‌الله بروجردی)
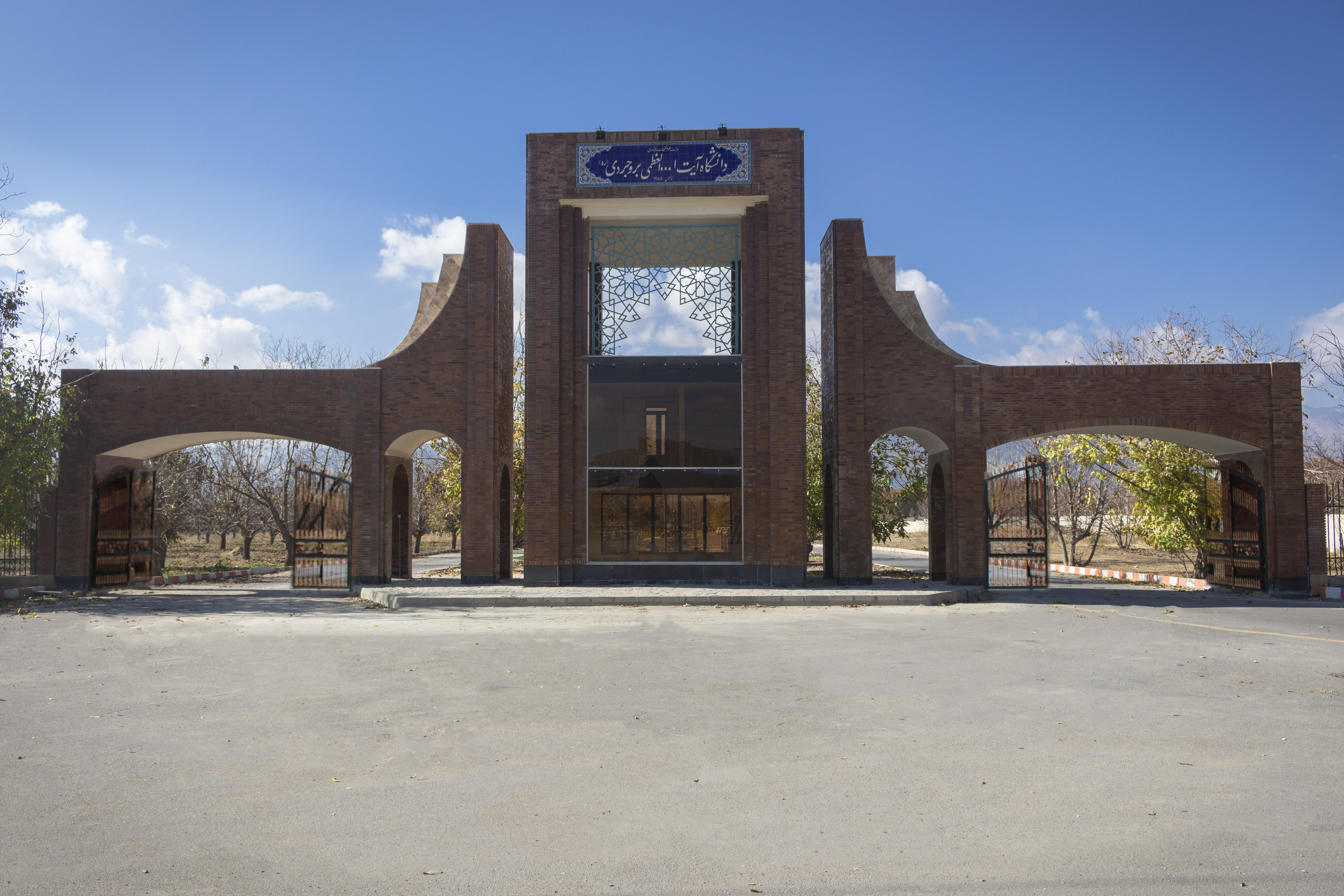
- Type: Public
- Established: 2006
- President: Ahmadreza Mazaheri
- Students: 5300
- Location: Boroujerd, Iran
- Website: abru.ac.ir/en/

Ayatollah Borujerdi University (ABRU, Persian: دانشگاه آیت‌الله بروجردی) is the only public university in Borujerd and the second largest public university in Lorestan province. The university was established in 2007 and became independent in 2008 and currently has more than 5,300 students, of which more than 4,400 are studying at the undergraduate level and more than 800 are studying at the postgraduate level. The current president of the university is Ahmad Reza Mazaheri.

Ayatollah Ozma Borujerdi University was established in Borujerd in 2007 and became an independent university in 2008.

The campus covers more than 30 acres and is organised into three faculties: Humanities, Engineering, and Basic Sciences. The university offers 14 undergraduate and 15 postgraduate programmes, enrols over 5,300 students, and has 101 faculty members.

== Faculties and academic fields ==
Ayatollah Boroujerdi University currently has 3 faculties, covering 22 undergraduate and 18 postgraduate fields of study:

Faculty of Humanities Majors and Fields

- Law
- Economics
- Social Science
- Islamic Studies
- Political Science
- Quranic and Hadith Studies
- Linguistics and English Language Teaching

Basic Science Majors and Fields

- Physics
- Chemistry
- Mathematics

Faculty of Engineering and Technology Majors

- Civil Engineering
- Energy Engineering
- Computer Engineering
- Mechanical Engineering
- Architectural Engineering
