= Jameh Mosque of Borujerd =

Mosque in Borujerd, Lorestan, Iran

- مسجد جامع بروجرد
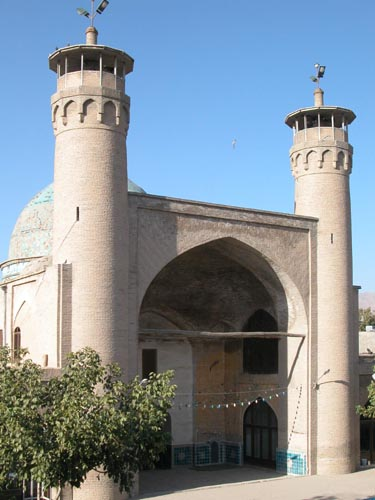
- The mosque in June 2006

- Location of the mosque in Iran

Religion
- Affiliation: Shia Islam
- Ecclesiastical or organisational status: Friday mosque
- Status: Active

Location
- Location: Borujerd, Borujerd County, Lorestān
- Country: Iran
- Coordinates: 33°53′45.07″N 48°45′47.69″E

Architecture
- Type: Mosque architecture
- Style: Sassanid (main structure); Seljuk (dome); Timurid (shabestan, west); Safavid (renovation); Qajar (minaret, iwan)
- Founder: Hamuyeh
- Completed: 9th century CE (main); 11th century (dome); 15th century (shabestan, west); 1613 (decree, entrance, west); 1679 (inscription, entrance); 1681 (door, shabestan, west); 1795 (minaret, iwan, south); 1799 (iwan, north); 2022 (renovations following earthquake)

Specifications
- Dome: One
- Minaret: Two

Iran National Heritage List
- Official name: Friday Mosque of Borujerd
- Type: Friday Mosque
- Designated: 1935
- Reference no.: 228
- Conservation organization: Cultural Heritage, Handicrafts and Tourism Organization of Iran

The Jāmeh Mosque of Borujerd (Persian: مسجد جامع بروجرد, romanized: Masjid-e-Jāmeh Borujerd) is a Shi'ite Friday mosque (Jāmeh) in Borujerd, Lorestan province, western Iran. Situated in the old district of Borujerd city, previously called Do Dangeh, the Jameh Mosque of Borujerd was built on an ancient fire temple of the pre-Islamic Sasanian Empire in the 3rd century AH (9th century CE), and is the oldest mosque in the Zagros area and western Iran.

The mosque was added to the Iran National Heritage List in 1935, administered by the Cultural Heritage, Handicrafts and Tourism Organization of Iran.

== Overview ==
The construction of this mosque is attributed to Hamula ibn Ali Borujerdi, or Hamuleh, said to have been appointed by the Abi-Dolaf rulers as the Governor of Borujerd in the 3rd century AH. The mosque was expanded and renovated up until 1799, when the minarets and iwans were completed.

An inscription at the entrance to the mosque states that it was constructed in 1068 AH (1657/1658 CE); however, this is most likely when the entrance was commenced. The entrance door of the mosque was built in 1092 AH (1681/1682 CE), under the command of Soltan Mohammad. In the 1209 AH (1794/1795 CE) Taqi Khan Razani was responsible for the construction of the top of two minarets called 'gol-dasteh'. The most beautiful part of the mosque is its minbar, which has nine steps and is made of wood, dating from 1068 AH. To the northern side of the sahn is a large area with fine columns used as a place for prayers. Here there is a carved wooden door above which has an inscription that is 25 by 38 centimetres (9.8 by 15.0 in), related to the reign of Shah Abbas I.

The mosque has two entrances, on its eastern and western sides. The Jameh Mosque has been used as a religious, trading and social affair centre. The mosque was bombed by Iraqi planes during the Iran–Iraq War in the 1980s and has been damaged by rain and earthquakes, including the 2006 Borujerd earthquake where the mosque's minarets were ruined along with other extensive damage. In 2022, the renovations of the mosque commenced.

== Gallery ==
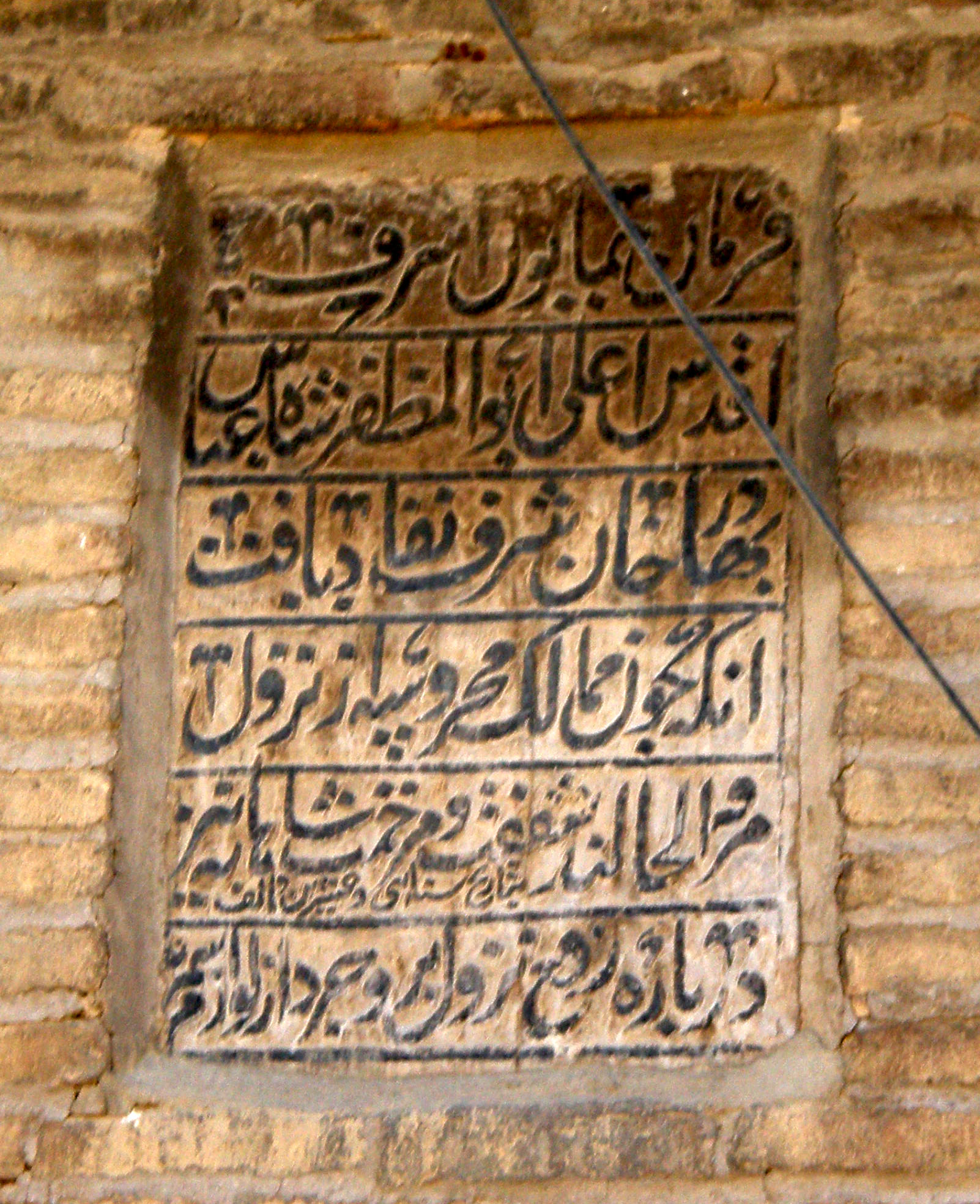
Safavid era engravings in the mosque.

Massive destruction of the mosque after the March 2006 earthquake.

== See also ==
- Shia Islam in Iran
- List of mosques in Iran
