= Imamzadeh Ja'far, Borujerd =

Shrine and mosque in Borujerd, Lorestan, Iran

Imāmzādeh Ja‘far
- امامزاده جعفر (بروجرد)
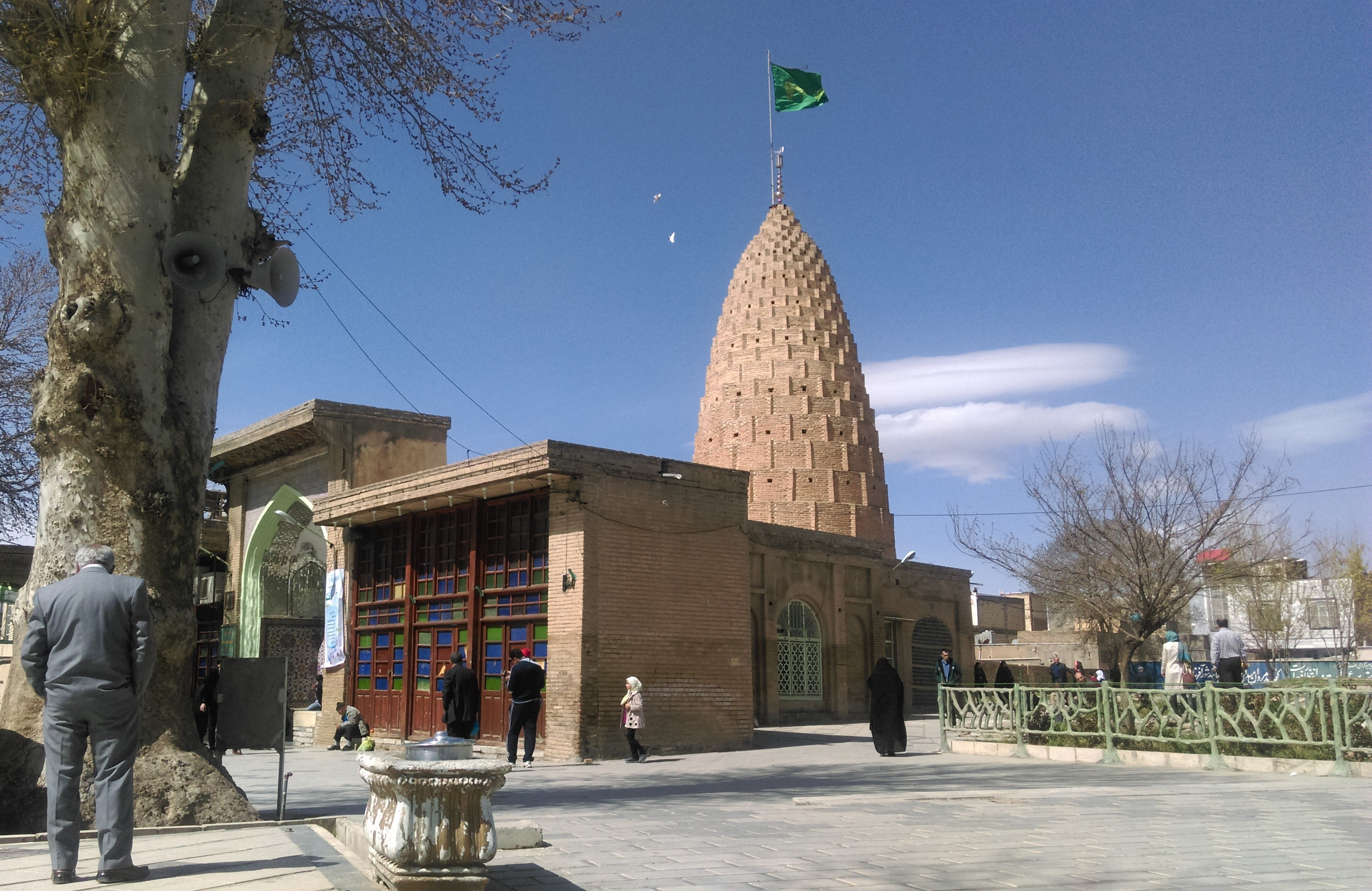
- Resting place of Ja‘far, grandson of ‘Alī ibn al-Husayn

- Location within Iran

Religion
- Affiliation: Shia Islam
- Ecclesiastical or organisational status: Imamzadeh and mosque

Location
- Location: Borujerd, Lorestan
- Country: Iran
- Coordinates: 33°53′25.29″N 48°46′12.33″E

Architecture
- Type: Mosque architecture
- Style: Seljuk; Ilkhanid; Safavid; Qajar
- Completed: 11th century CE; 1317 CE

Specifications
- Dome: One
- Dome height (outer): 25 m (82 ft)
- Shrine: One: (Ja‘far)
- Materials: Bricks; mortar

Iran National Heritage List
- Official name: Imāmzādeh Ja‘far
- Type: Built
- Designated: 5 May 1997
- Reference no.: 1855
- Conservation organization: Cultural Heritage, Handicrafts and Tourism Organization of Iran

The Imāmzādeh Ja‘far (Persian: امامزاده جعفر (بروجرد); Arabic: مرقد جعفر الكاظم (بروجرد)) is a Shia Imamzadeh and mosque, located in Borujerd, Lorestan province, western Iran. The mausoleum contains the grave of Abulqāsim Ja’far ibn al-Husayn, grandson of the 4th Shia Imam Ali al-Sajjad.

The complex was added to the Iran National Heritage List on 5 May 1997, administered by the Cultural Heritage, Handicrafts and Tourism Organization of Iran.

== Overview ==
Built in the 11th century CE, Imamzadeh Jafar is one of the few examples of Seljuk and Ilkhanid architecture in Iran. A very similar mausoleum is the Tomb of Daniel in Susa, south western Iran.

The building is octagonal with a high dome in the center. The height of the conic-shaped dome is 25 metres (82 ft) from the base. The main entrance is on the east side and there are two halls decorated with tile work from the Safavid and Qajar eras. The shrine is located in the middle of a cemetery with many old graves and trees.

The 2006 Borujerd earthquake caused extensive damage to the tomb. The mud-brick parts of the building were damaged and a hole appeared on the dome.

== Gallery ==
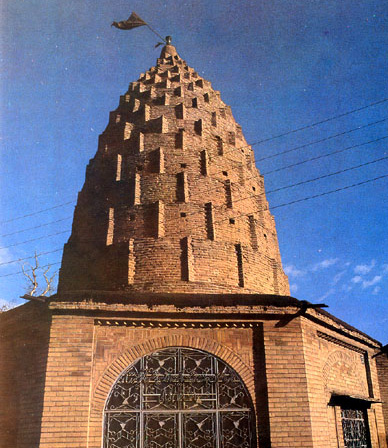

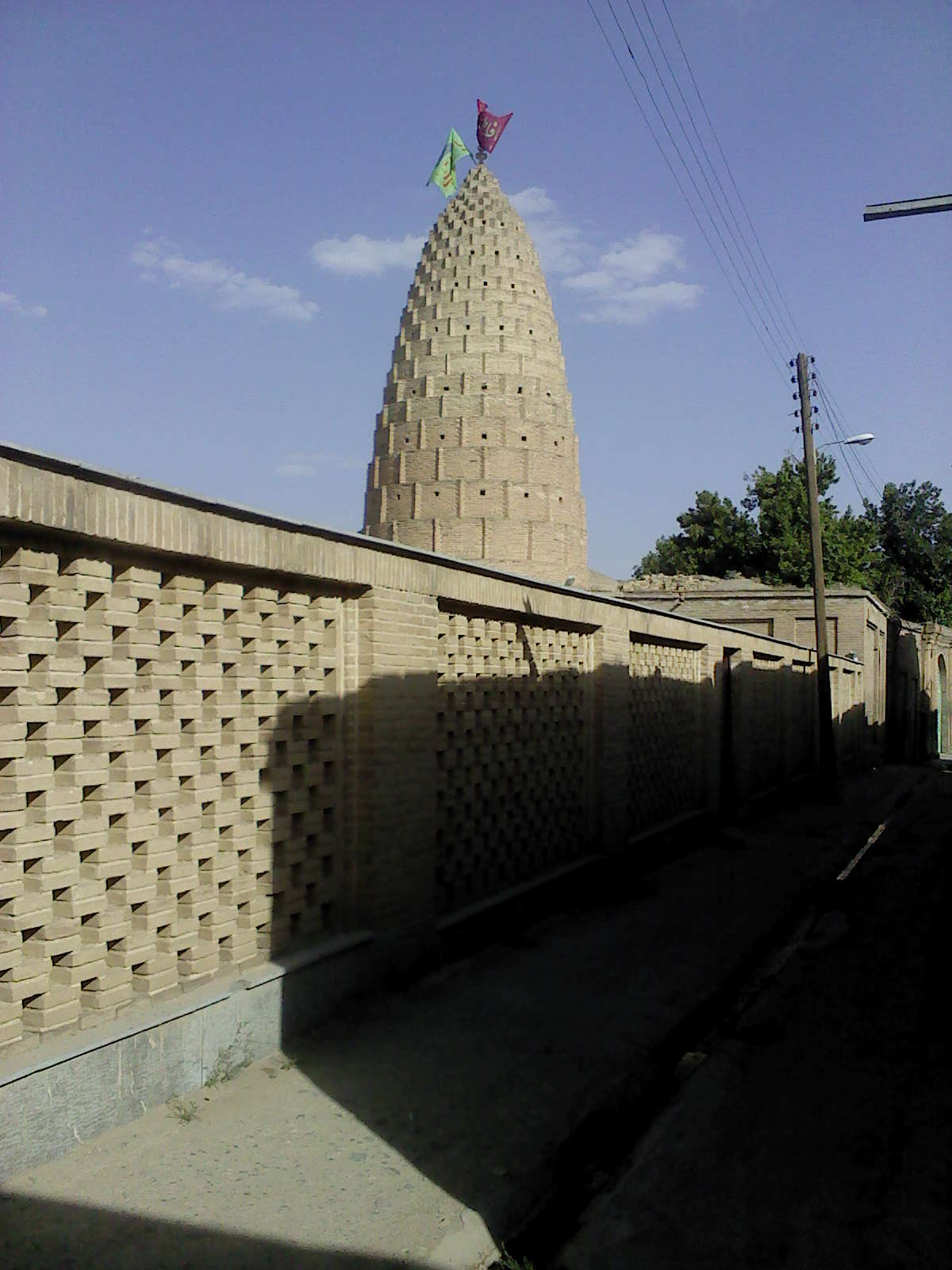

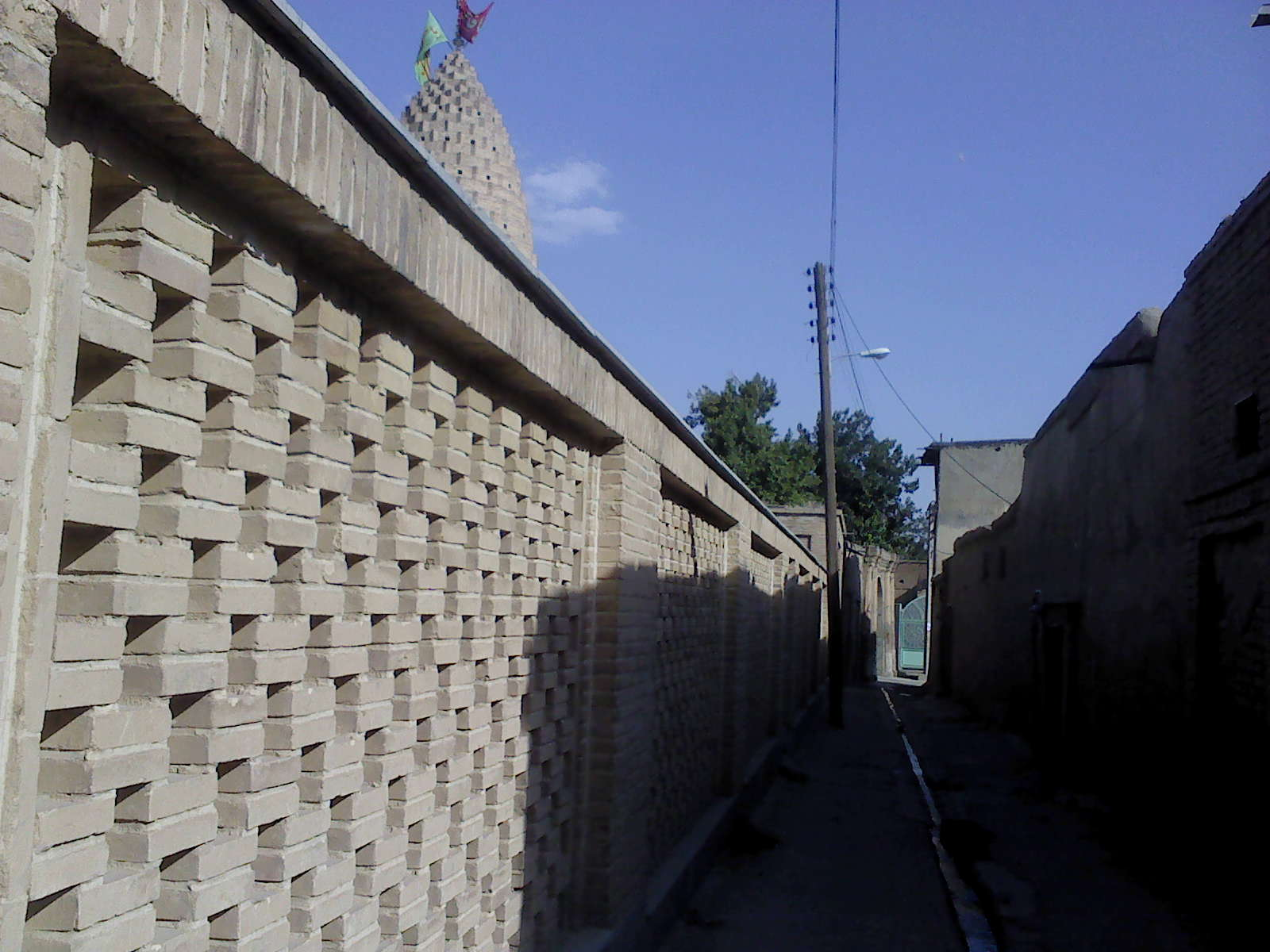

== See also ==
- Shia Islam in Iran
- Holiest Shia sites in Islam
- List of imamzadehs in Iran
- List of mosques in Iran
