= Farnaz Esmaeilzadeh =

Iranian speed climber

Personal information
- Native name: فرناز اسماعیل‌زاده
- Full name: Farnaz Esmaeilzadeh
- Nationality: Iran
- Born: 29 April 1988 (age 38) Borujerd, Iran

Sport
- Country: Iran
- Sport: Competition climbing
- Event: Speed
Medal record
Event / 1st / 2nd / 3rd; Asian Championships / 1 / 1 / 2
Asian Championships
Gold medal – first place	2013 Tehran	Speed
Silver medal – second place	2014 Lombok	Speed
Bronze medal – third place	2016 Duyun	Speed relay
Bronze medal – third place	2017 Tehran	Speed relay

Farnaz Esmaeilzadeh (Persian: فرناز اسماعیل‌زاده, born 29 َApril 1988) is an Iranian competition speed climber from Borujerd. In 2015 she won a gold medal at the Canadian national championship and placed seventh in the IFSC Climbing World Cup overall rankings. Esmaeilzadeh received a silver medal in the 2016 climbing Escalade Canada (CEC) National Speed Climbing Championships in Central Saanich, British Columbia.
