= Mir Shamsuddin Adib-Soltani =

Iranian philosopher (1931–2023)

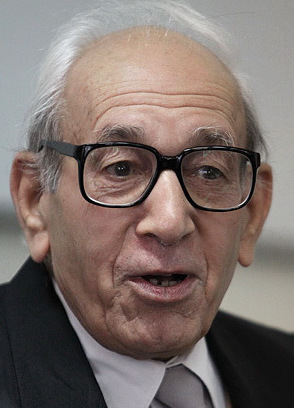
- Born: 12 May 1931; Borujerd, Persia
- Died: 12 October 2023 (aged 92); Tehran, Iran
- Awards: Farabi International Award

Education
- Education: University of Tehran (MD)

Philosophical work
- Era: 21st-century philosophy
- Region: Western philosophy Analytic philosophy
- School: Analytic philosophy

Mir Shamsuddin Adib-Soltani (Persian: میر شمس‌الدین ادیب‌سلطانی; 12 May 1931 – 12 October 2023) was an Iranian philosopher, clinical psychiatrist, and translator. He is known for translating some classic philosophical works into Persian. Adib-Soltani was a winner of Farabi International Award. Adib-Soltani died on 12 October 2023, at the age of 92.

== Books ==
- An Introduction to the Writing of the Persian Script. Amir Kabir Publishers, Tehran, 1976.
- The Question of the Left and Its Future: Notes of an Onlooker, Hermes Publishers, Tehran, 2010. ISBN 9789643636401
- Topics in Decision Problem, Amir Kabir Publishers, Tehran, 2013. ISBN 978-964-00-1495-0

=== Translations ===
- Critique of Pure Reason by Immanuel Kant
- Organon by Aristotle
- Tractatus Logico-Philosophicus by Ludwig Wittgenstein
- Principles of Mathematical Logic by David Hilbert and Wilhelm Ackermann
- Philosophical Essays by Bertrand Russell
- The Tragedy of Hamlet, Prince of Denmark by William Shakespeare
- The Tragedy of King Richard the Third by William Shakespeare
