= Borujerd =

City in Lorestan province, Iran

Borujerd Persian: بروجرد
- City
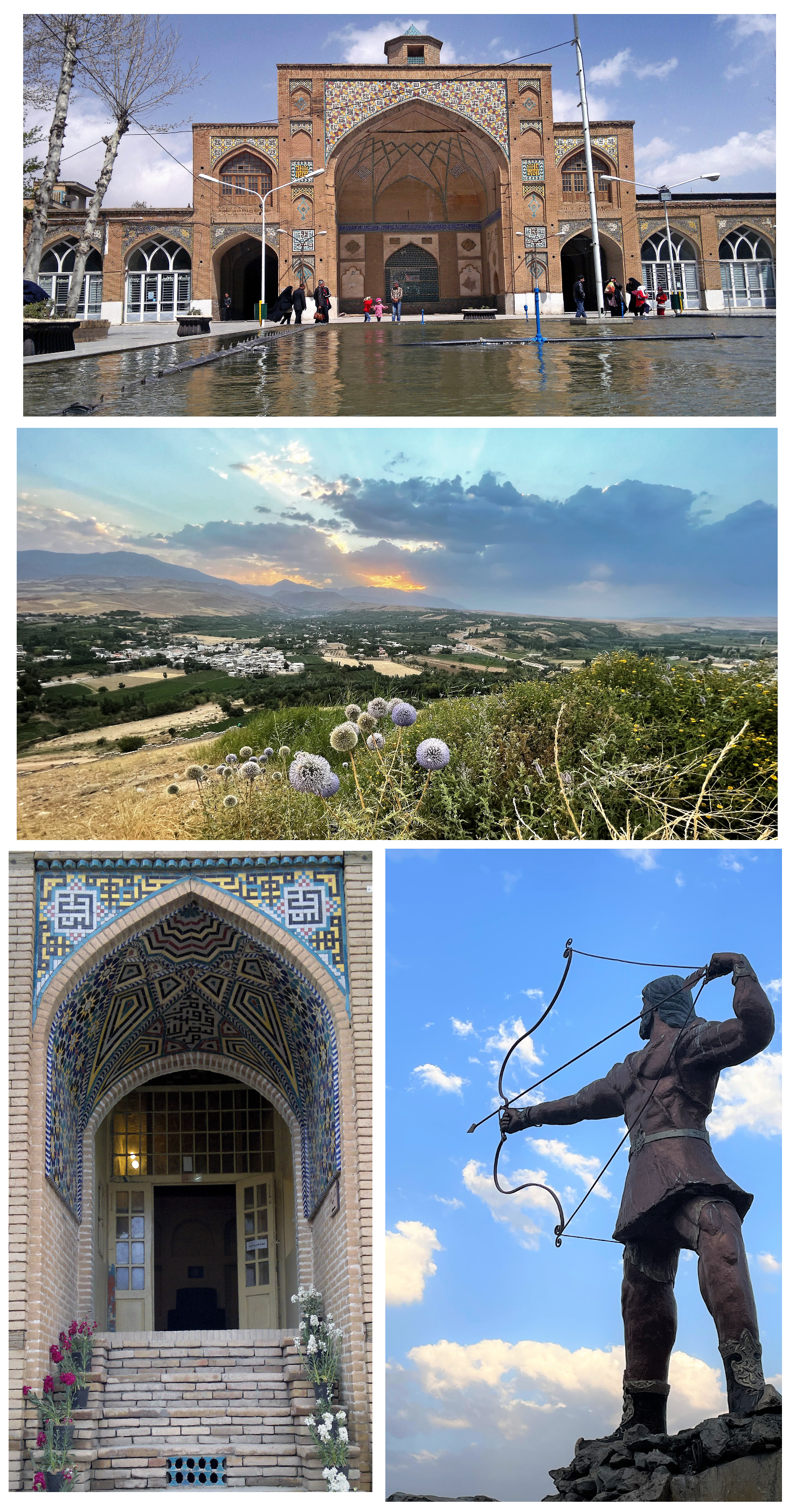
- Top left: Grand yard of Sultani mosque, Middle: Outlook of Zagros Mountains, Bottom left: Eftekhar-al-Eslam old house, Bottom right: the statute of Arash the Archer

- Location within Iran
- Coordinates: 33°54′40″N 48°45′08″E
- Country: Iran
- Province: Lorestan
- County: Borujerd
- District: Central

Area
  - City: 43 km^{2} (17 sq mi)
- Elevation: 1,573 m (5,161 ft)

Population (2016)
  - City: 234,497
  - Estimate (2026): 224,079
  - Rank: 39th in Iran
  - Density: 5,500/km^{2} (14,000/sq mi)
  - Urban: 252,000
  - Metro: 326,452
- Time zone: UTC+03:30 (IRST)
- Area code: (+98) 66

Borujerd (Persian: بروجرد; [boɾuːˈdʒeɾd]) (Note: Also romanized as Borūjerd) is a city in the Central District of Borujerd County, Lorestan province in western Iran, serving as capital of both the county and the district.

Among the existing modern cities of Iran, Borujerd is one of the oldest reported at least since the 9th century. In Sassanid Empire, Borujerd was a small town and region neighboring Nahavand. Gaining more attention during Great Seljuq Empire in the 9th and 10th centuries, Borujerd stood as an industrial, commercial and strategic city in Zagros Mountains until the 20th century. In its golden ages, Borujerd was selected as the state capital of Lorestan and Khuzestan region during Qajar dynasty in the 18th and 19th centuries. Due to the existence of a large number of production and industrial units and the supply of their products in the domestic and foreign markets, Borujerd is considered the industrial hub of Lorestan province.

== Foundation and name ==
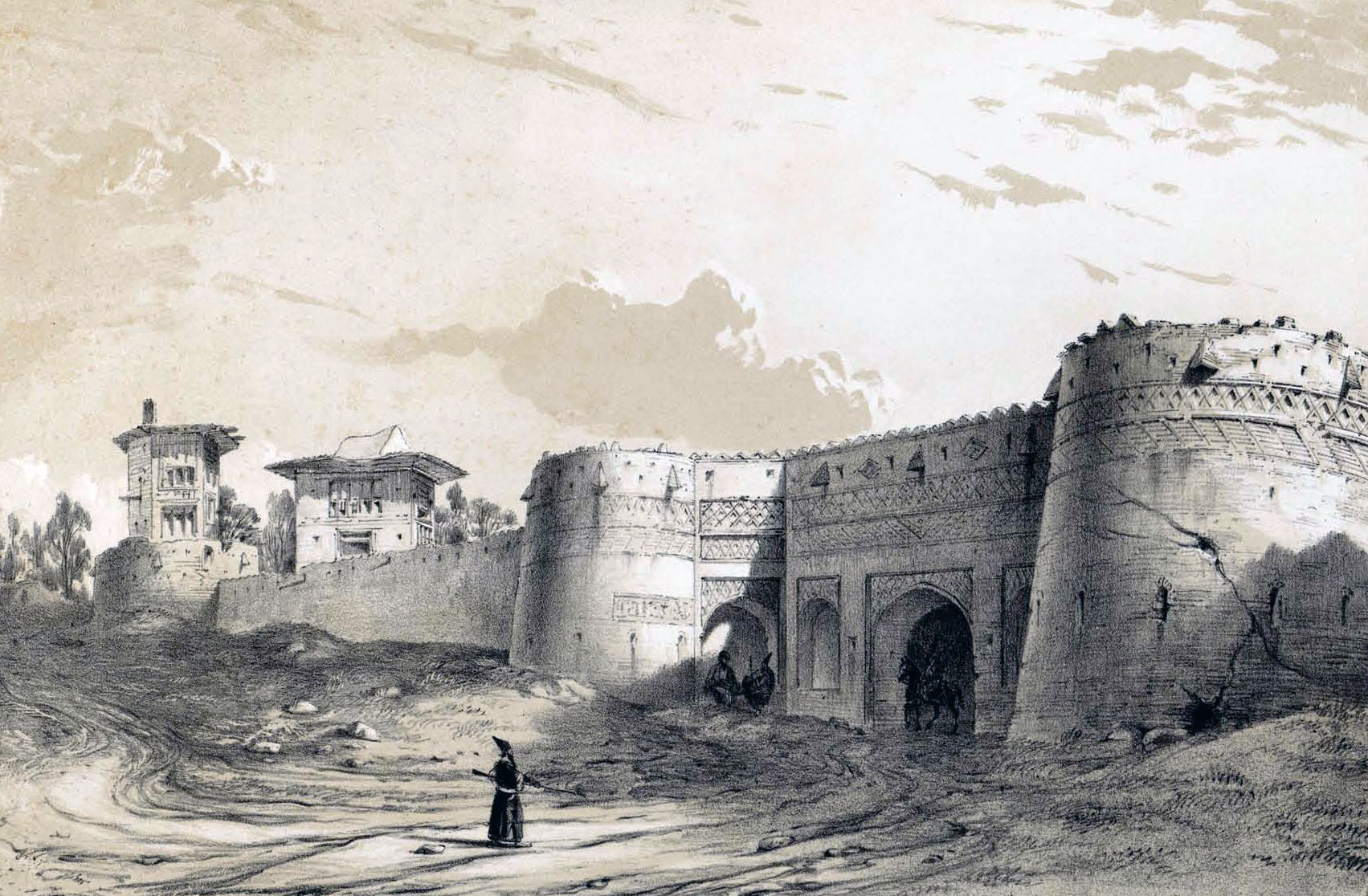
City Gate of Boroudgerd by Eugène Flandin

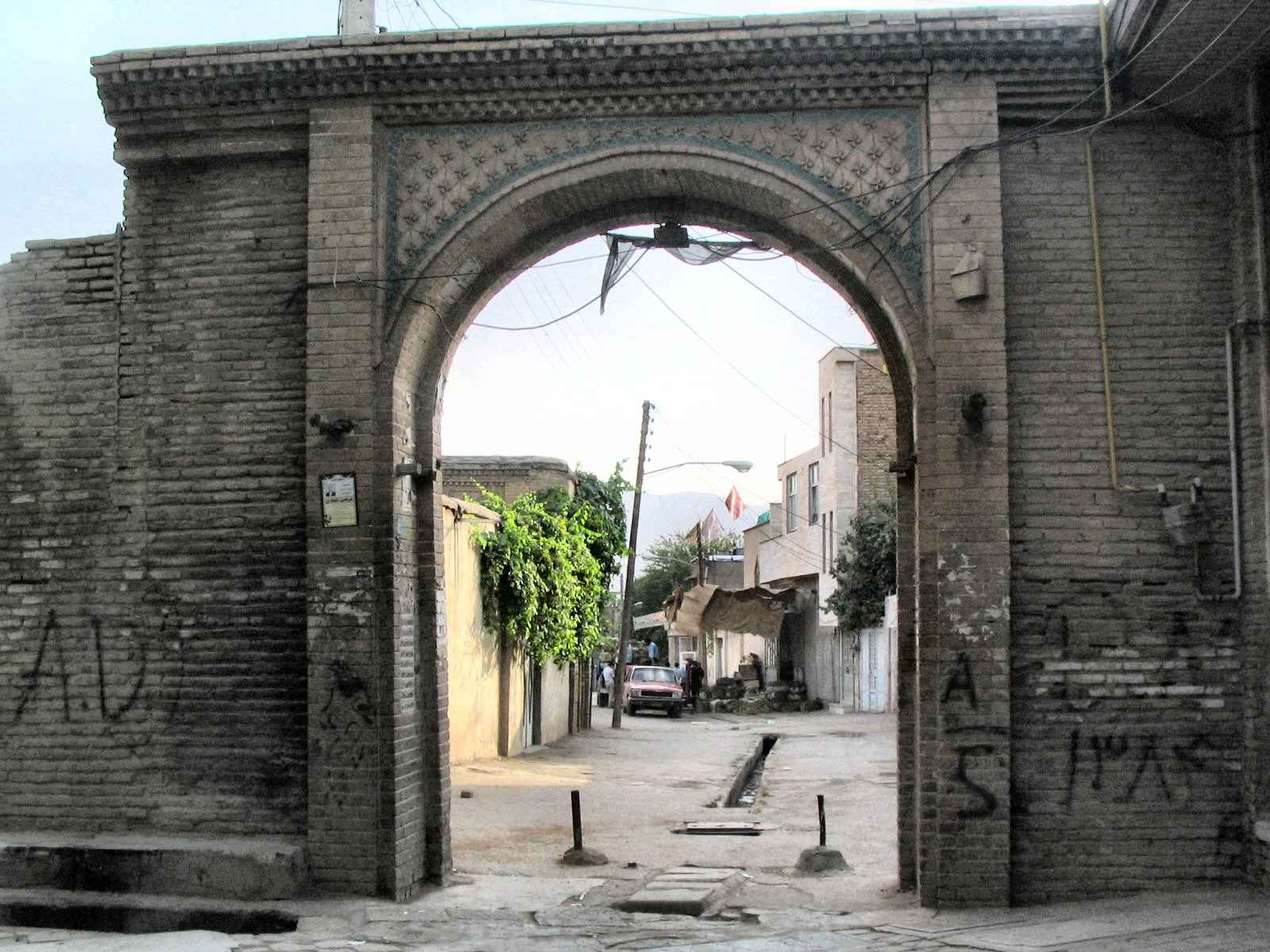
Old gate of Imamzadeh Jafar

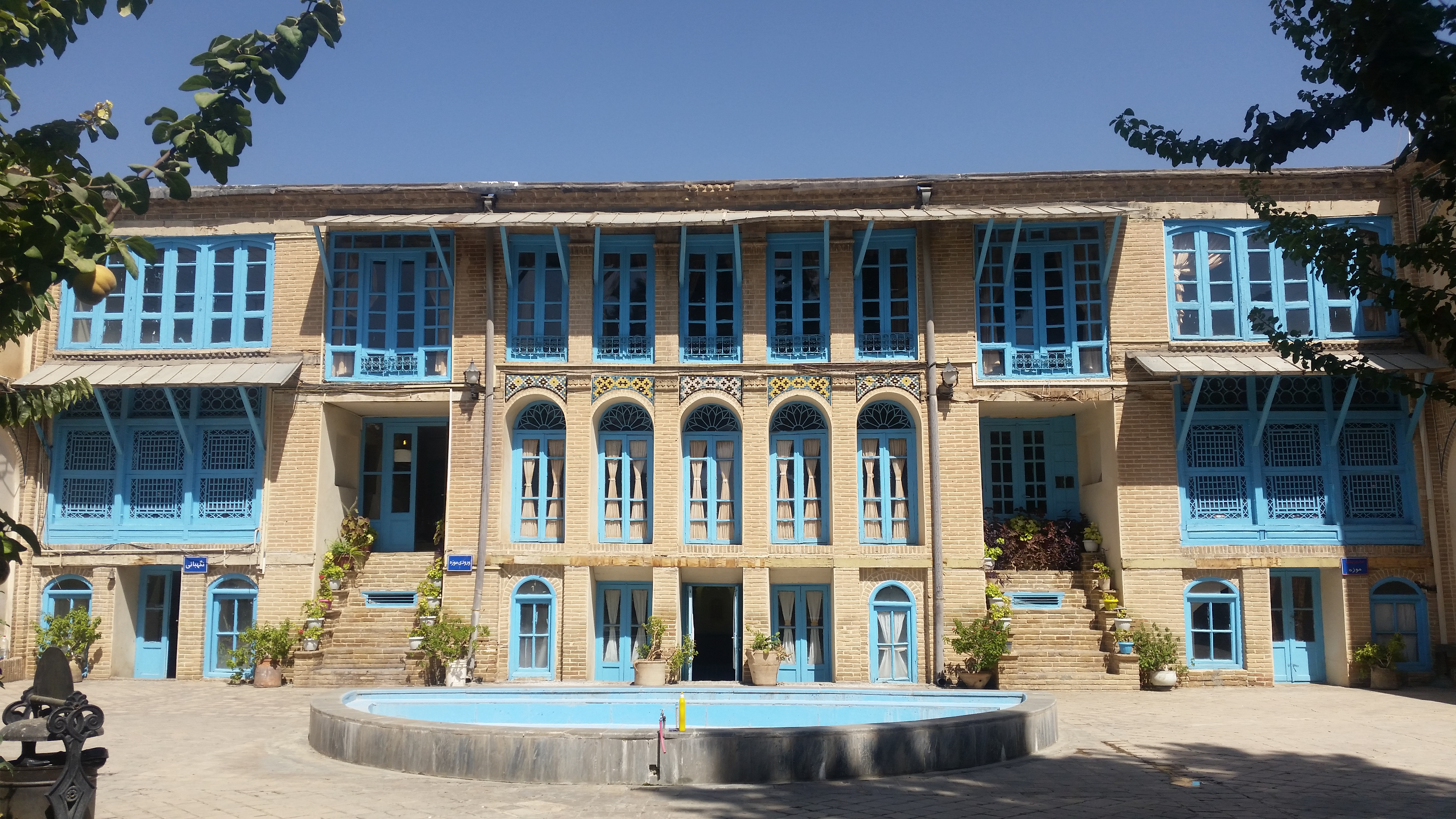
Tabatabai House

The history of Borujerd before the advent of Islam is not well known. Parthian-era artifacts have been discovered in its environs by non-professional excavators. A former Zoroastrian fire temple once stood on the site where one of Iran's oldest mosques, the Jameh Mosque of Borujerd, was later constructed. This proves that the region was populated before Islam arrived. The Parthian king Orodes II (r. 57–37 BC) is credited by some academics with laying the city's foundation. They believe that the Parthian word Wurūgird/Wulūgird/Orodhkard ("built by Orodes") was the original version of "Borujerd". Others consider it to have been built by the Sasanian king Peroz I (r. 459–484), arguing that "Piruzgird" was its original name, before being changed into "Burugird", and then later Arabicised into "Burujird".

== History ==
Only from the 9th-century does the name "Borujerd" appear in Islamic chronicles. It first appears in the Kitāb al-buldān of Ibn al-Faqih (fl. 903), and is later reported in various forms, such as "Warukird", "Warugird", "Barugird" and "Barujird". In 1809, the governorship of Lorestan and Khuzestan was granted to the Qajar prince Mohammad Taqi Mirza. He made Borujerd his residence and, to protect the town, created a moat around it and repaired the old fortress. Borujerd developed into a sizable garrison town and a significant military hub by the end of the 18th century. It was used by the Qajars as a base for campaigns aimed at consolidating control over the western regions, especially against the Lur tribes.

Esteemed religious institutions operated in Borujerd during the Qajar era, producing two distinguished Shia scholars, Asad Allah Borujerdi (died c. 1854) and Hossein Borujerdi (died 1961).

== Demographics ==
=== Language ===
The linguistic composition of the city:

Borujerd linguistic composition (2022)
Language	percent
Persian	45%
Luri	29%
Silakhori	15%
Laki of Lorestan	10%
Judeo-Borujerdi	0.01%
Other	0.99%

=== Population ===
Borujerd is the 31st largest city in Iran and the 2nd largest in Lorestan . Borujerd is the industrial point of Lorestan. Its historical and cultural background as well as its remarkable nature, has changed it to a tourist destination. The city has been named as Dār-Al-Sorur which means the house of happiness. Borujerd's population was estimated about 20000 in mid-1800s.

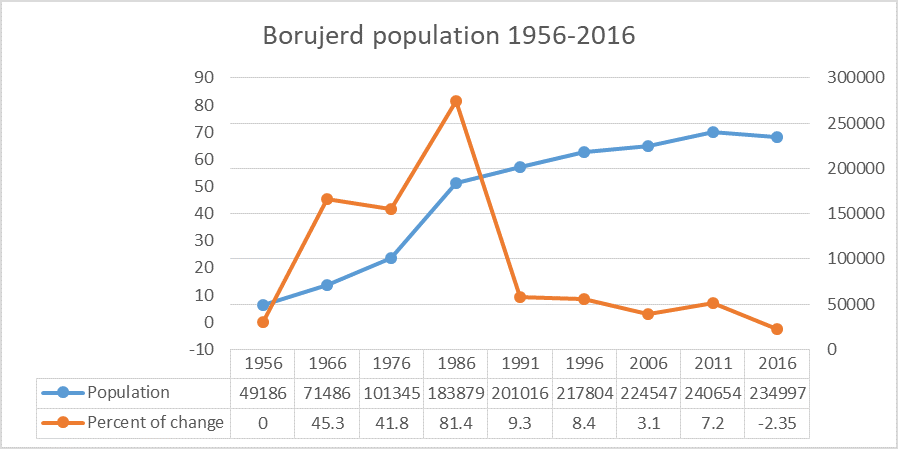
Borujerd population change based on national statistics.

At the time of the 2006 National Census, the city's population was 334,497 in 59,388 households. The following census in 2011 counted 240,654 people in 71,730 households. The 2016 census measured the population of the city as 234,997 people in 74,146 households.

== Geography and climate ==
=== Location ===
Borujerd city is located approximately 1670 meters above sea level and has a moderate climate with cold winters. The highest point is Garrin Mountain 3623 m above sea level and the lowest area is Gelerood River in South with 1400 m elevation. Borujerd Township has 2600 km^{2} area with approximately 400,000 inhabitants distributed in the city of Oshtorinan and more than 180 villages. Owing to favorable topographic and climatic conditions, the plains are devoted to cultivation of grain. Wherever irrigation is possible (by means of qanāts, wells, diversion of water of streams), cotton, melons, grapes, and fruit trees (especially almonds) are grown.

Borujerd is located on Silakhor Plain which is the largest agricultural land of Lorestan. The high-elevated Zagros Mountains surrounds it from South East to North West and the peaks are covered with snow most of the time. Rural people work in farms or keep their domestic animals. Other people work in governmental offices, armed forces, factories or small local businesses. The feet of Zagros Mountains is a great destination for nomads and many Lurs and Bakhtiari nomads move there in summer. The area is paved with highways and is a crossroad between Tehran and Khuzestan Province as well as Isfahan Province and Kermanshah Province.

=== Climate ===
Borujerd's climate is classified as Mediterranean(Köppen: Csa) with dry and very hot summers and cold winters. Most of the precipitation falls in colder months from November to April. Snowfall can be observed in winter, which can sometimes become heavy and cause school closures in the county. Road access to villages can also be disturbed because of snow.

Climate data for Borujerd (1989-2010)
Month	Jan	Feb	Mar	Apr	May	Jun	Jul	Aug	Sep	Oct	Nov	Dec	Year
Daily mean °C (°F)	1.1 (34.0)	3.8 (38.8)	8.1 (46.6)	13.1 (55.6)	17.9 (64.2)	23.8 (74.8)	27.8 (82.0)	27.4 (81.3)	22.7 (72.9)	16.9 (62.4)	9.7 (49.5)	4.6 (40.3)	14.7 (58.5)
Average precipitation mm (inches)	61.4 (2.42)	61.8 (2.43)	89.0 (3.50)	68.9 (2.71)	22.4 (0.88)	2.5 (0.10)	0.5 (0.02)	0.7 (0.03)	0.8 (0.03)	19.9 (0.78)	64.7 (2.55)	65.9 (2.59)	458.5 (18.04)
Source: IRIMO(temperature)(precipitation)

== Historical attractions ==
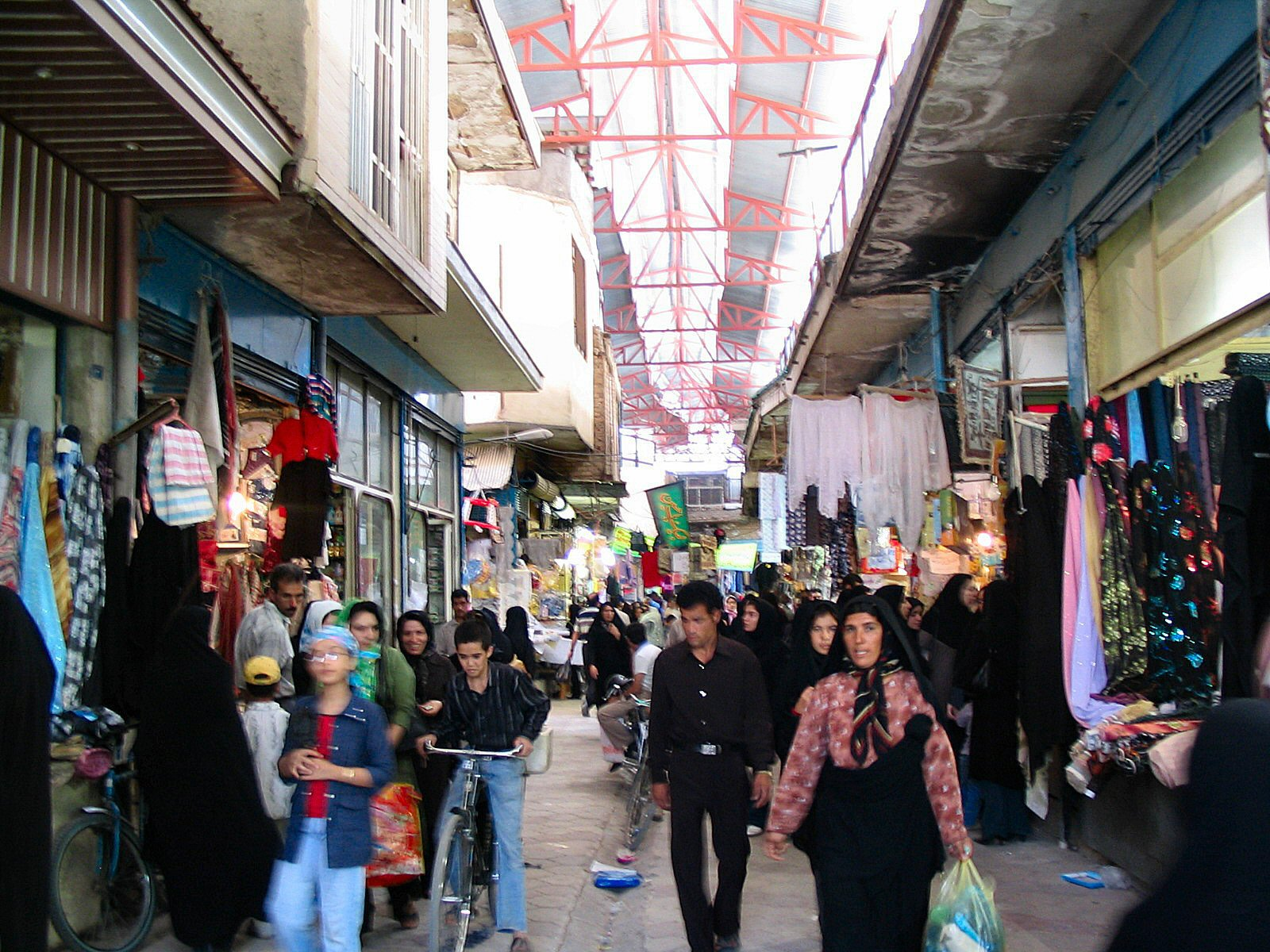
The Bazaar of Borujerd

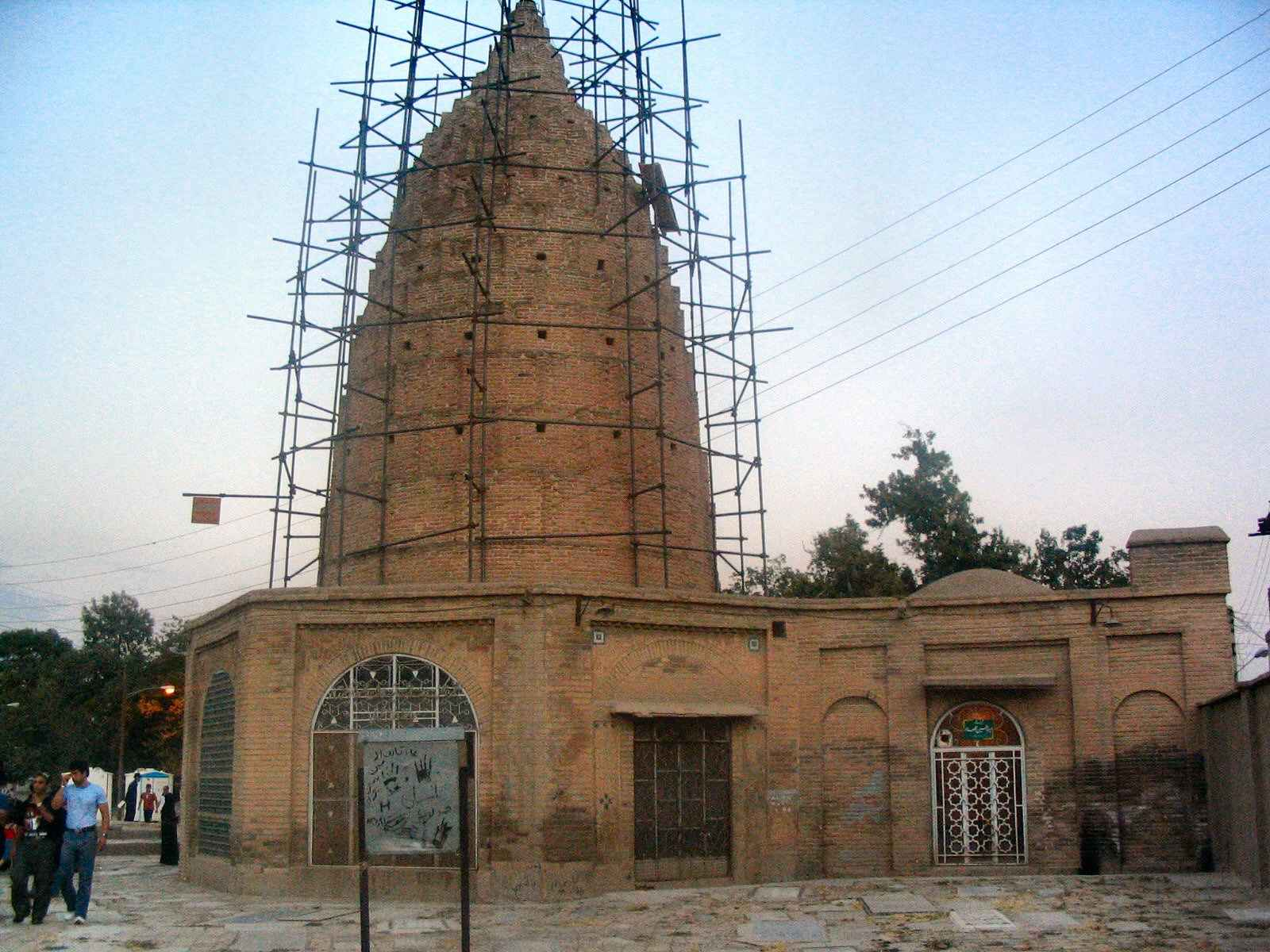
Imamzadeh Ja'far Shrine

- Jameh Mosque of Borujerd
- Soltani Mosque of Borujerd
- Imamzadeh Ja'far, Borujerd
- Bazaar of Borujerd

== Parks and natural attractions ==
- Goldasht Valley, Borujerd
- Vennaii Village, Borujerd
- Chogha Hill of Borujerd
- Bishe Dalan Pound, Borujerd
- Oshtorankuh, Dorood
- Women's Park of Borujerd

== Notable people ==
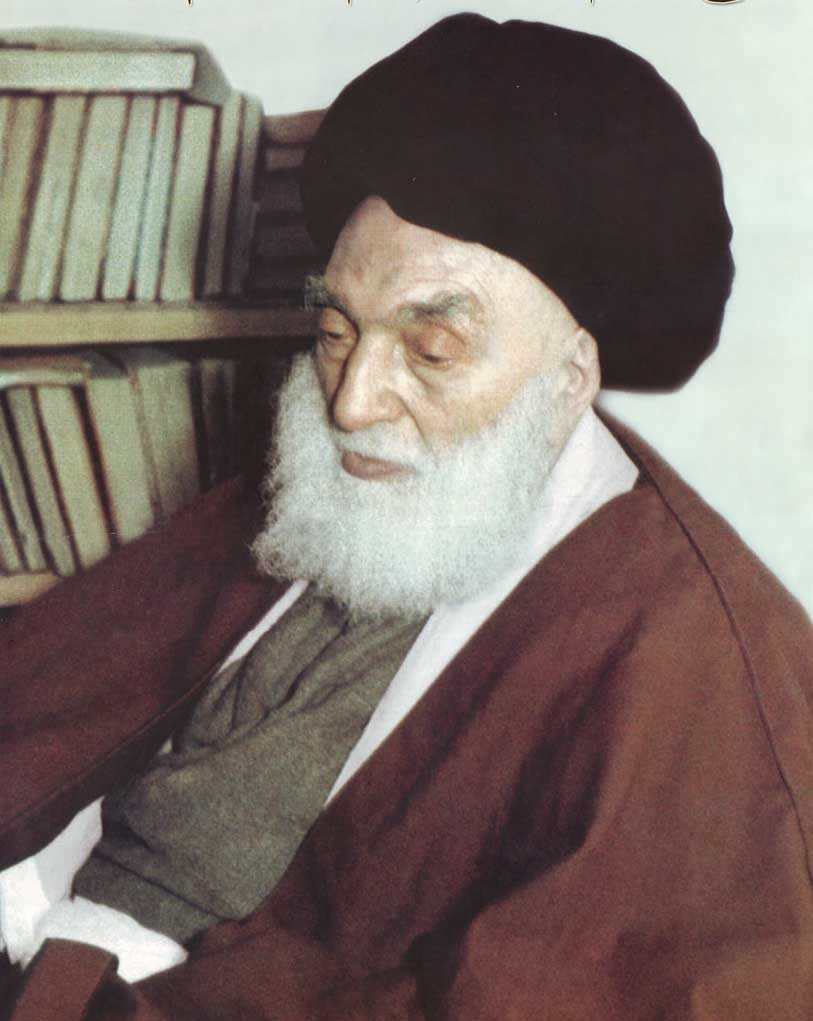
Hossein Borujerdi

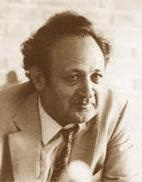
Abdolhossein Zarrinkoob

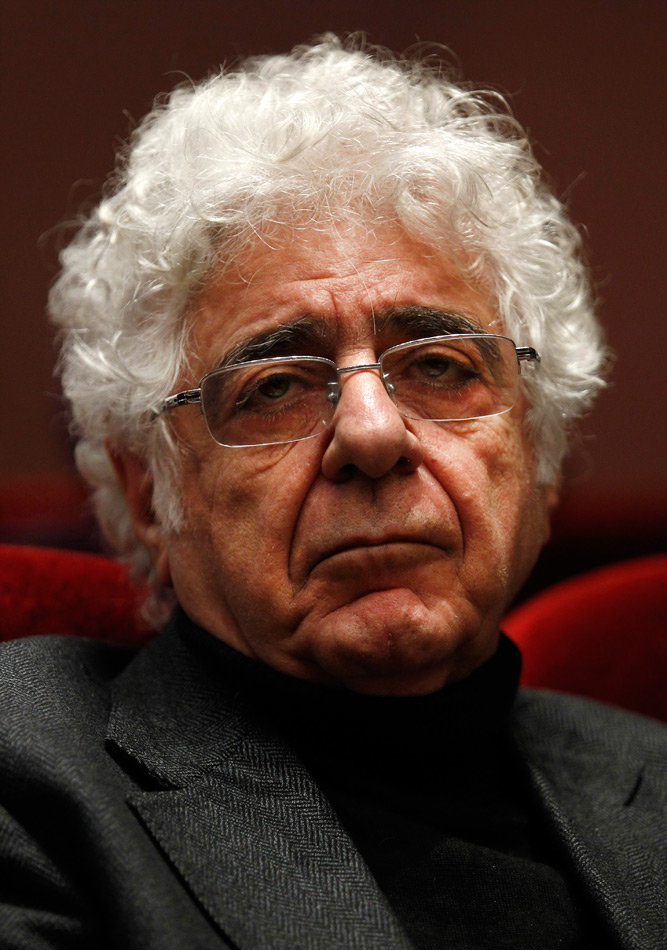
Loris Tjeknavorian

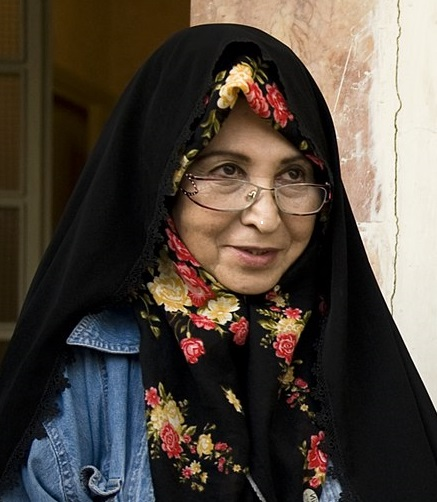
Zahra Rahnavard

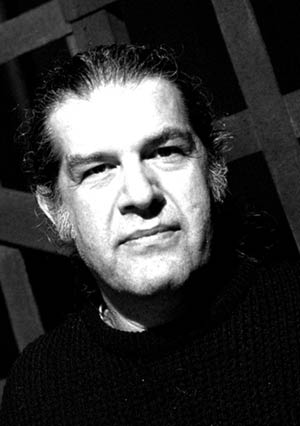
Mostafa Abdollahi

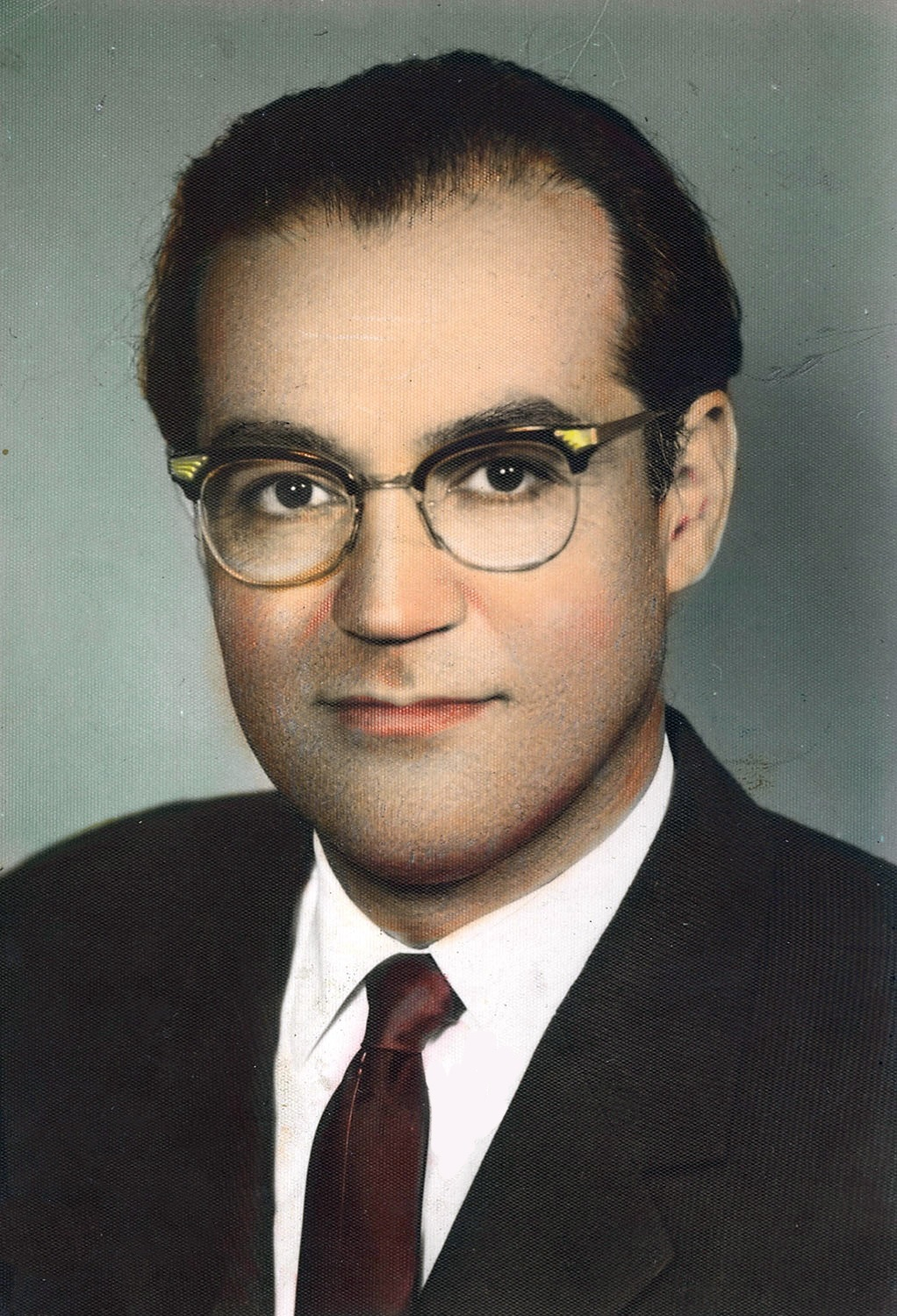
Jafar Shahidi

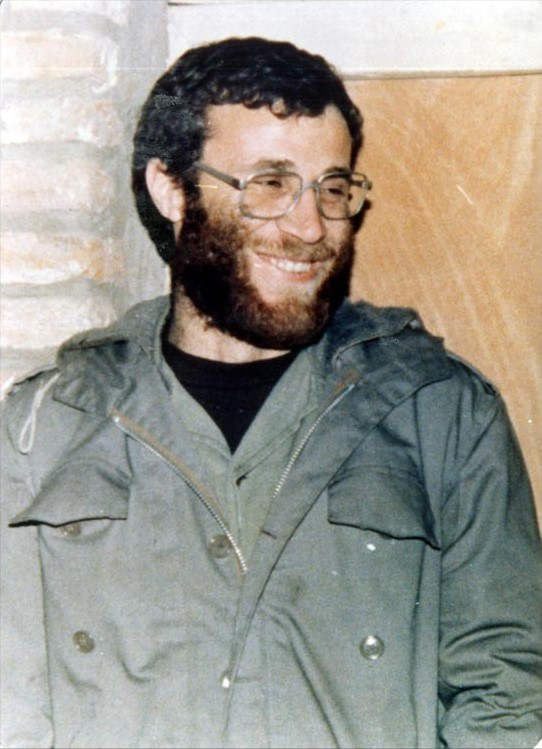
Mohammad Boroujerdi

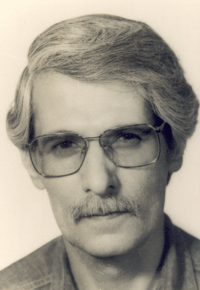
Mehrdad Avesta

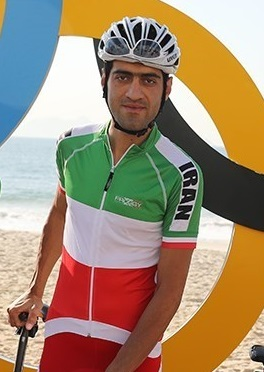
Arvin Moazzami

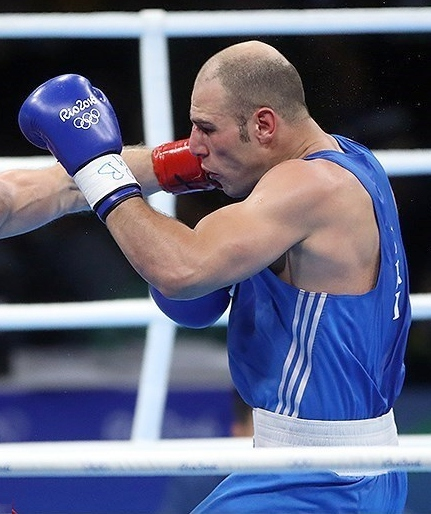
Ehsan Rouzbahani

- Mehrdad Avesta, poet 20th-century
- Ali Abdo, athlete
- Salar Abdoh, novelist
- Mostafa Abdollahi, director and actor
- Mir Shamsuddin Adib-Soltani, philosopher
- Abdolmohammad Ayati, author and field of philosophy
- Reza Beiranvand, athlete
- Hossein Kazemeyni Boroujerdi, twelver Shi'i
- Hossein Borujerdi, religious leader
- Mohammad Boroujerdi, commander
- Mahvash (1920–1961; also known as Masoumeh Azizi Borujerdi), singer, dancer, film actress and stage performer
- Arvin Moazzami, athlete
- Ahmad Moballeghi, professor
- Zahra Rahnavard, first female chancellor of a university, Alzahra University (1998–2006) after the Iranian Revolution, was under house arrest from 2011 to 2018
- Jafar Shahidi, historian and bibliographer
- Moḥammad Mahdi Baḥr al-Ulūm, mystic
- Ahmad Khatami, professor
- Ehsan Rouzbahani, athlete
- Iraj Rad, actor
- Farnaz Esmaeilzadeh, athlete
- Mohammad Hanif, writer
- Mahmoud Khatami, philosopher
- Bahram Ghasemi, diplomat
- Abolghasem Khazali, shi'i cleric
- Farnaz Esmaeilzadeh, speed climber
- Shahram Entekhabi, video and installation artist
- Saman Salur, film director
- Mahmoud Saremi, reporter
- Ehsan Mohajer Shojaei, middle-distance running
- Loris Tjeknavorian, musician
- Mohammad-Reza Zarrindast, pharmacologist
- Abdolhossein Zarrinkoob, writer and historian

== Gallery ==
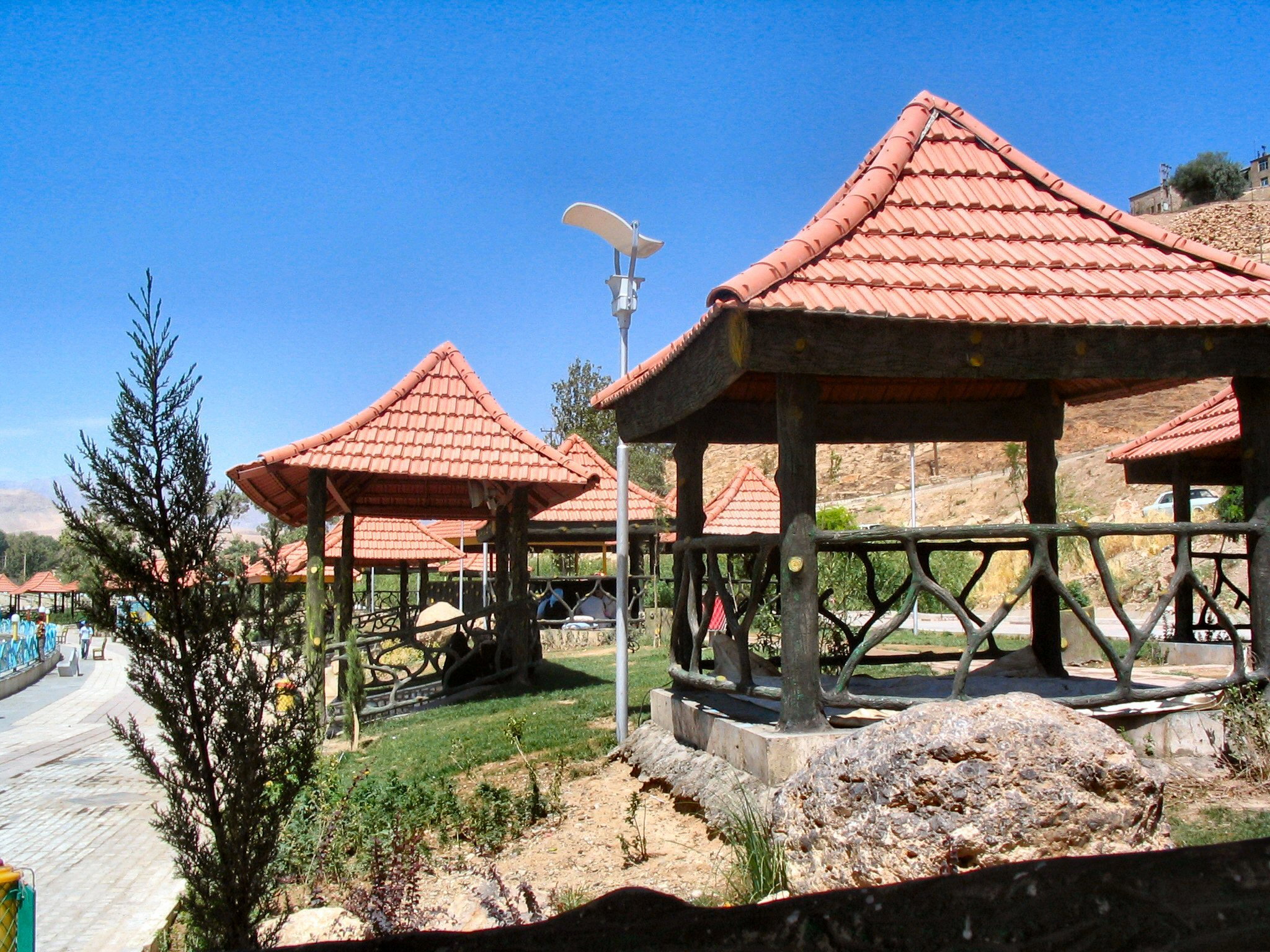
Fadak Park

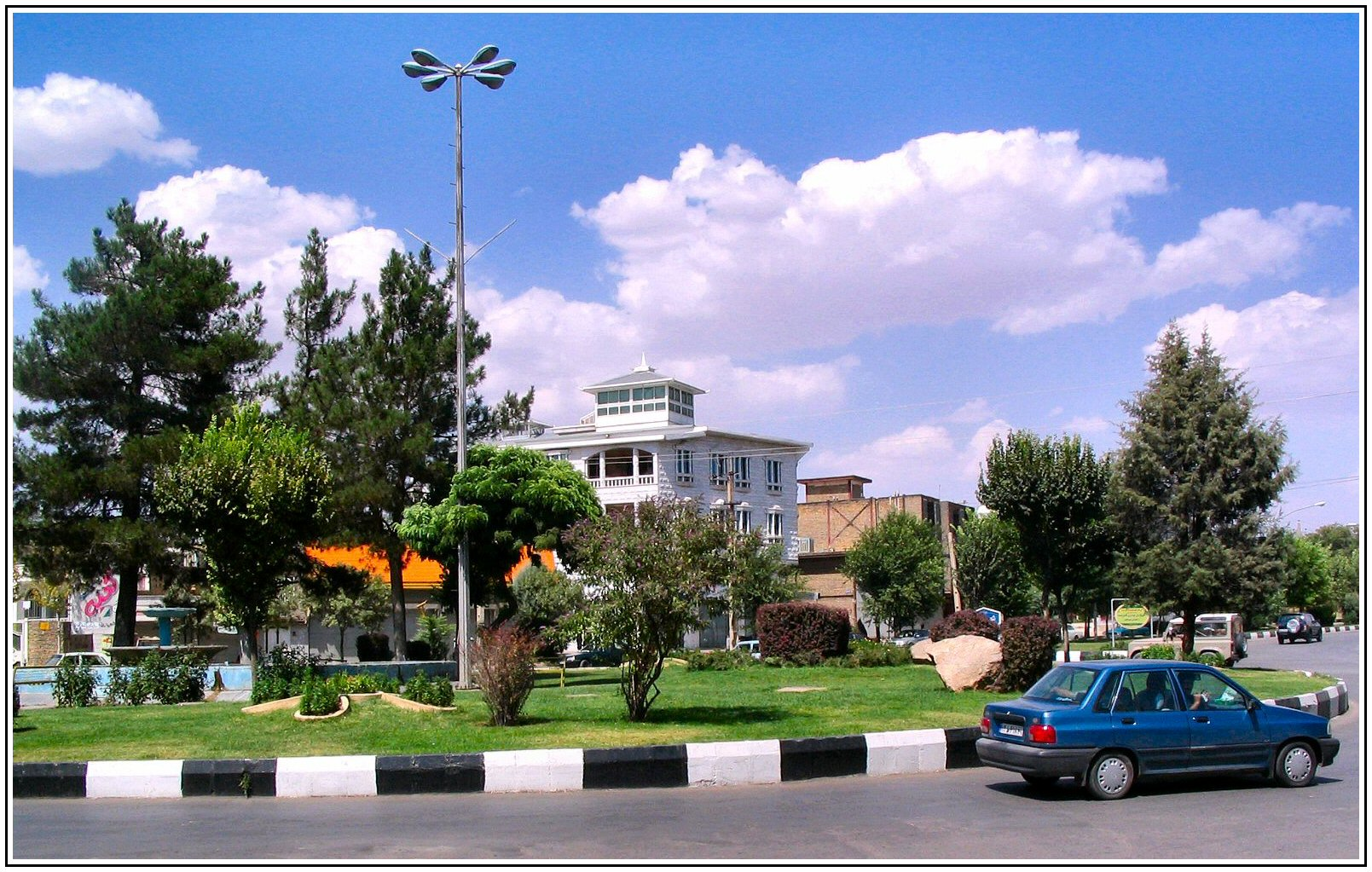
Yadbood Square.

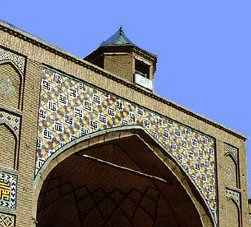
Soltani Mosque (18th century)

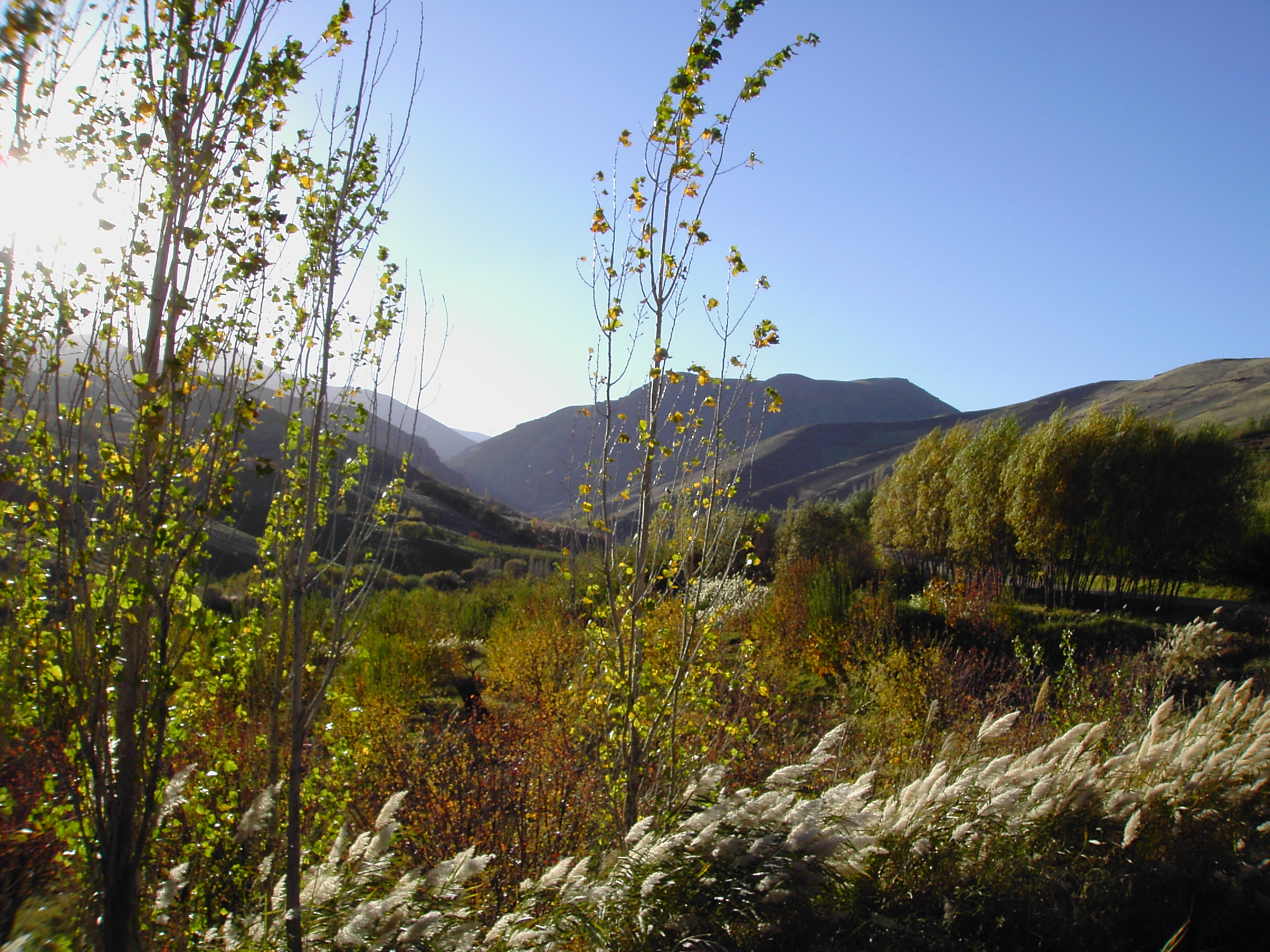
Goldasht Valley.

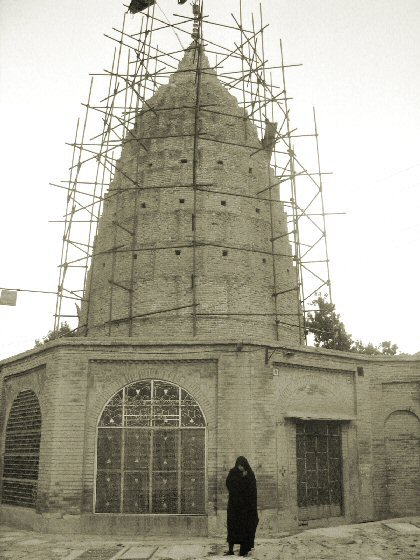
Imamzadeh Ja'far (11th century)

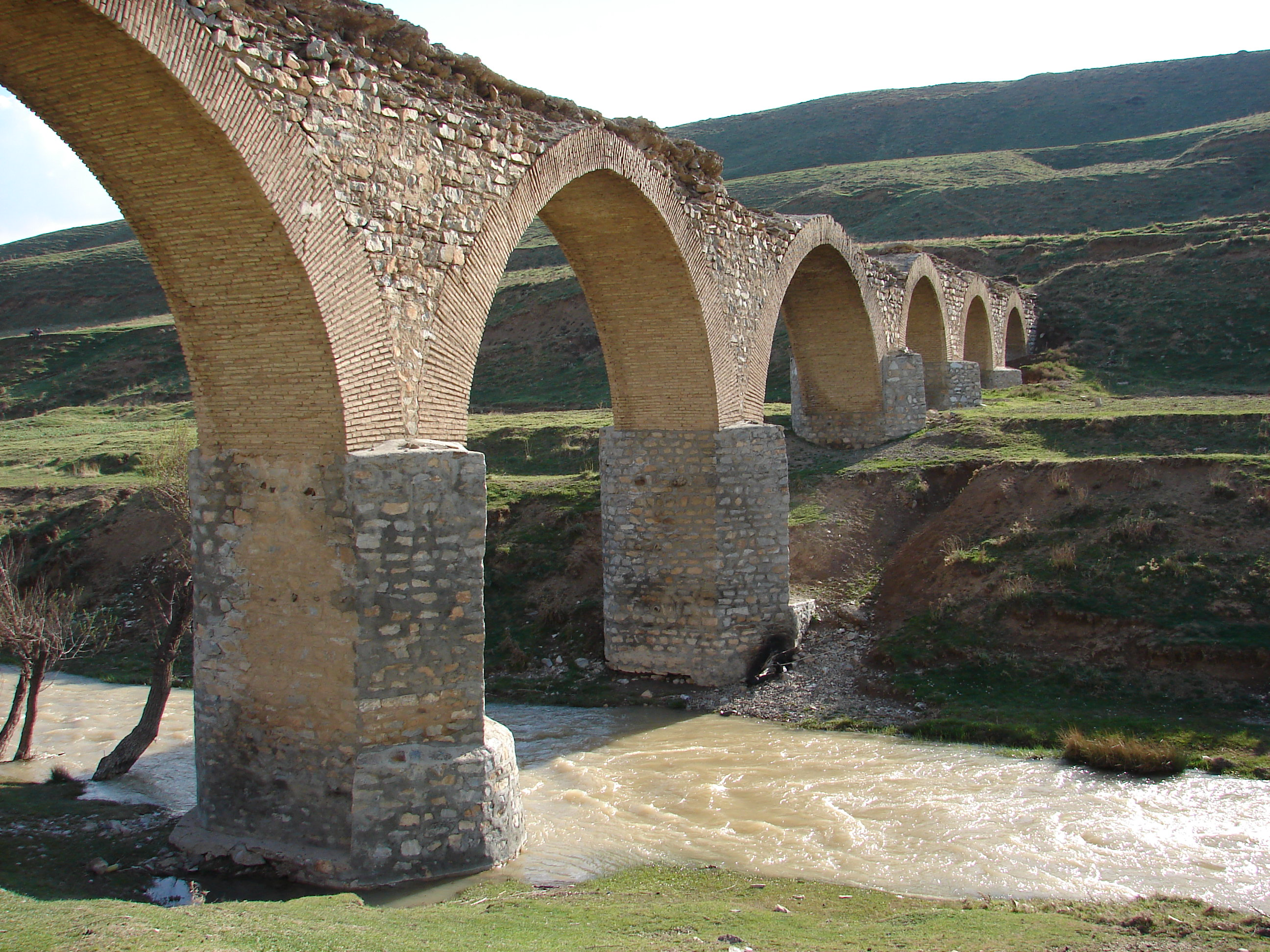
Qale Hatam Bridge

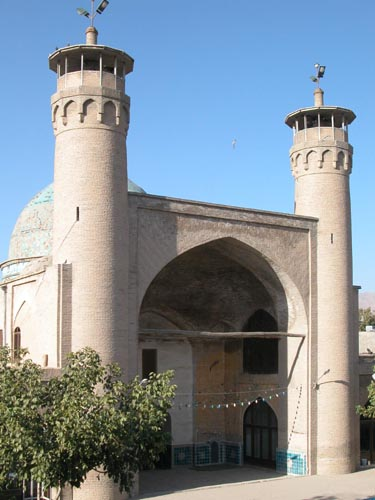
Jameh Mosque.

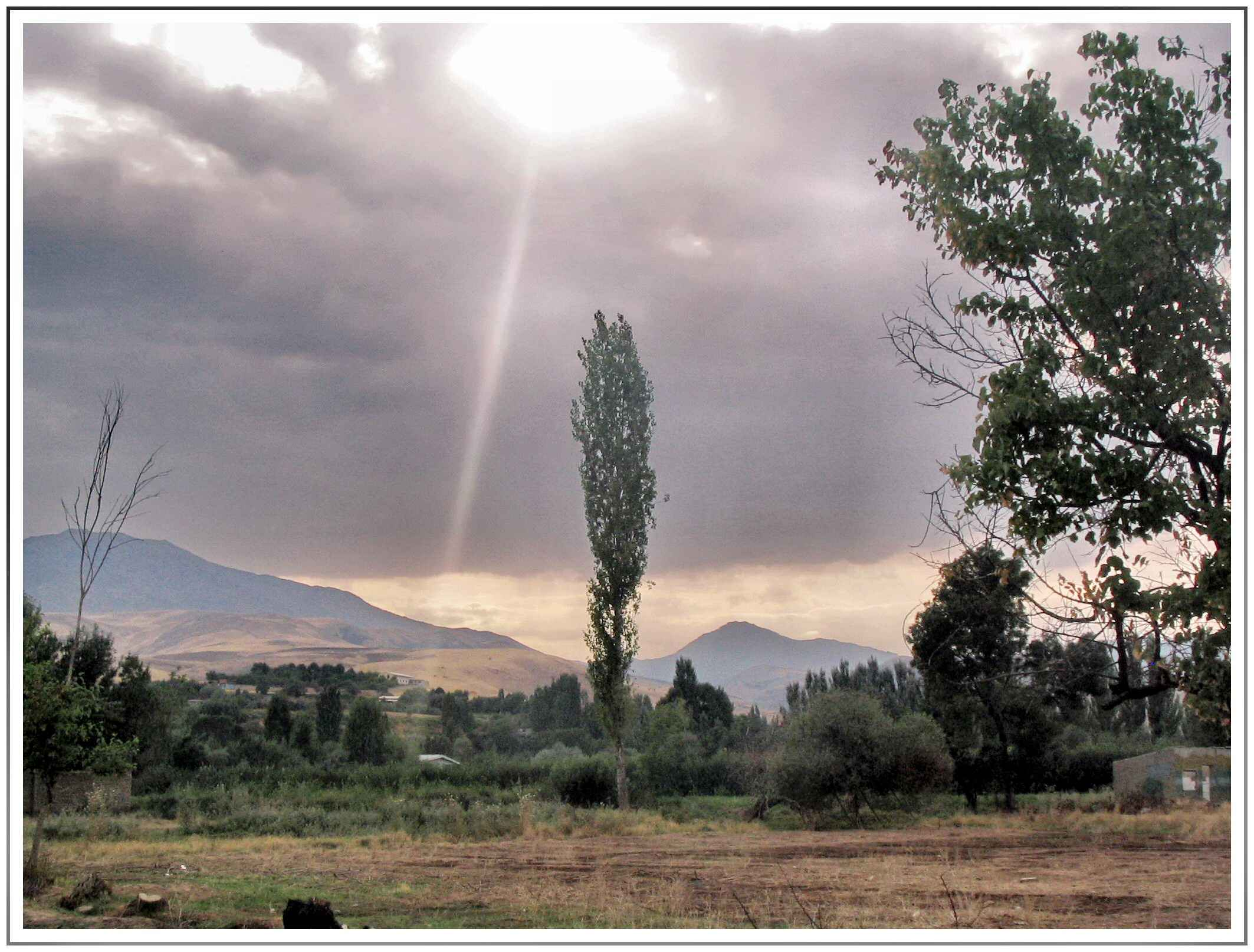
Countryside of Borujerd.

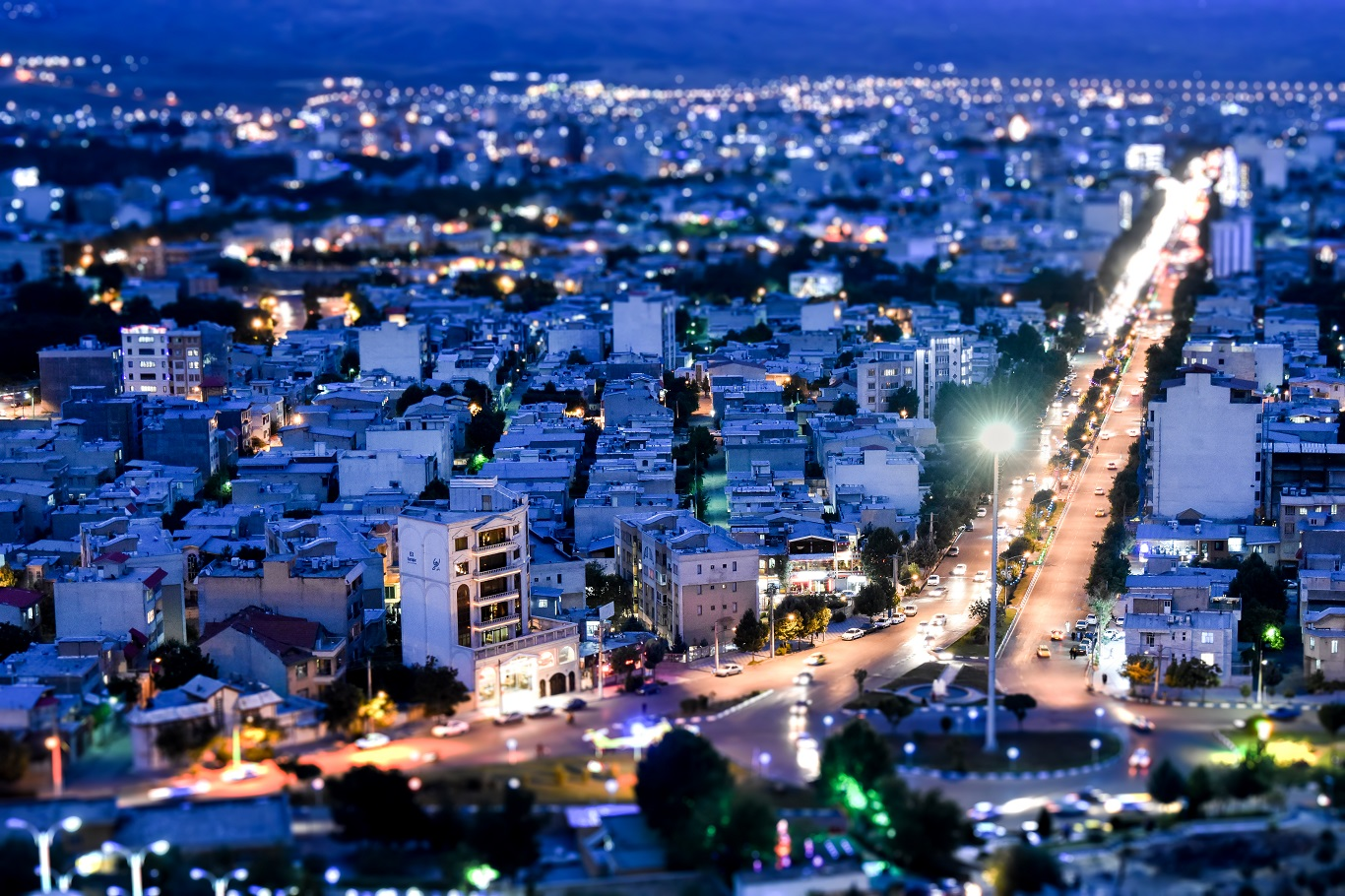
Borujerd View of Takhti street.

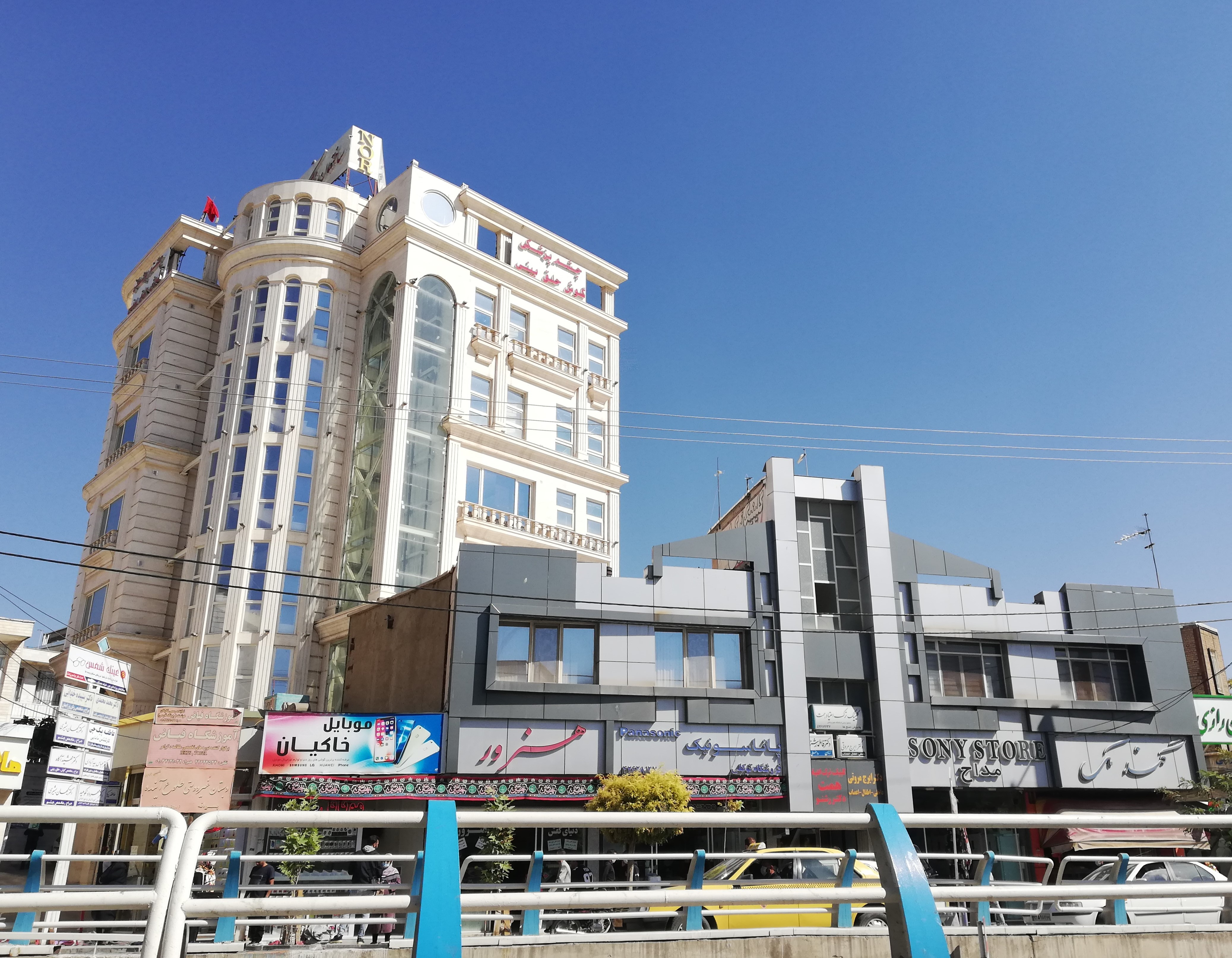
Borujerd downtown

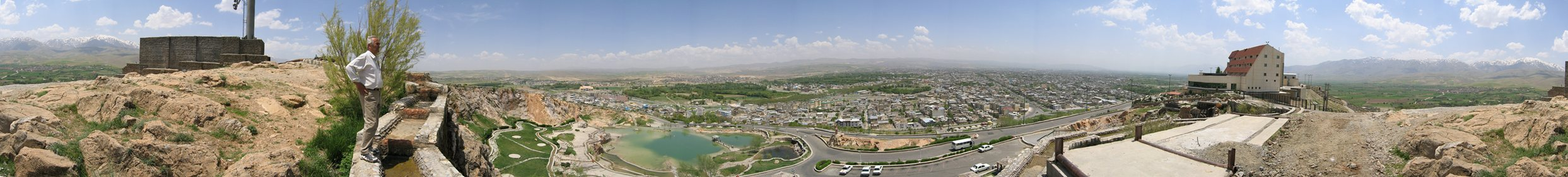
Panoramic view to the City

== See also ==
- 1909 Borujerd earthquake
- 2006 Borujerd earthquake
- Borujerdi dialect

Media related to Borujerd at Wikimedia Commons

Borujerd travel guide from Wikivoyage

== Sources ==
- Mobayyen, Abolhasan (2021). "Burūjird". In Madelung, Wilferd; Daftary, Farhad (eds.). Encyclopaedia Islamica Online. Brill Online. ISSN 1875-9831.
