= Silakhor Plain =

Silakhor Plain (Persian: دشت سیلاخور, romanized: Dasht-e Silakhor) is the largest flat land in Lorestan province of Iran. Located in the northeast of Lorestan, Silakhor covers most of the populated parts of Borujerd, Dorud and Azna counties.

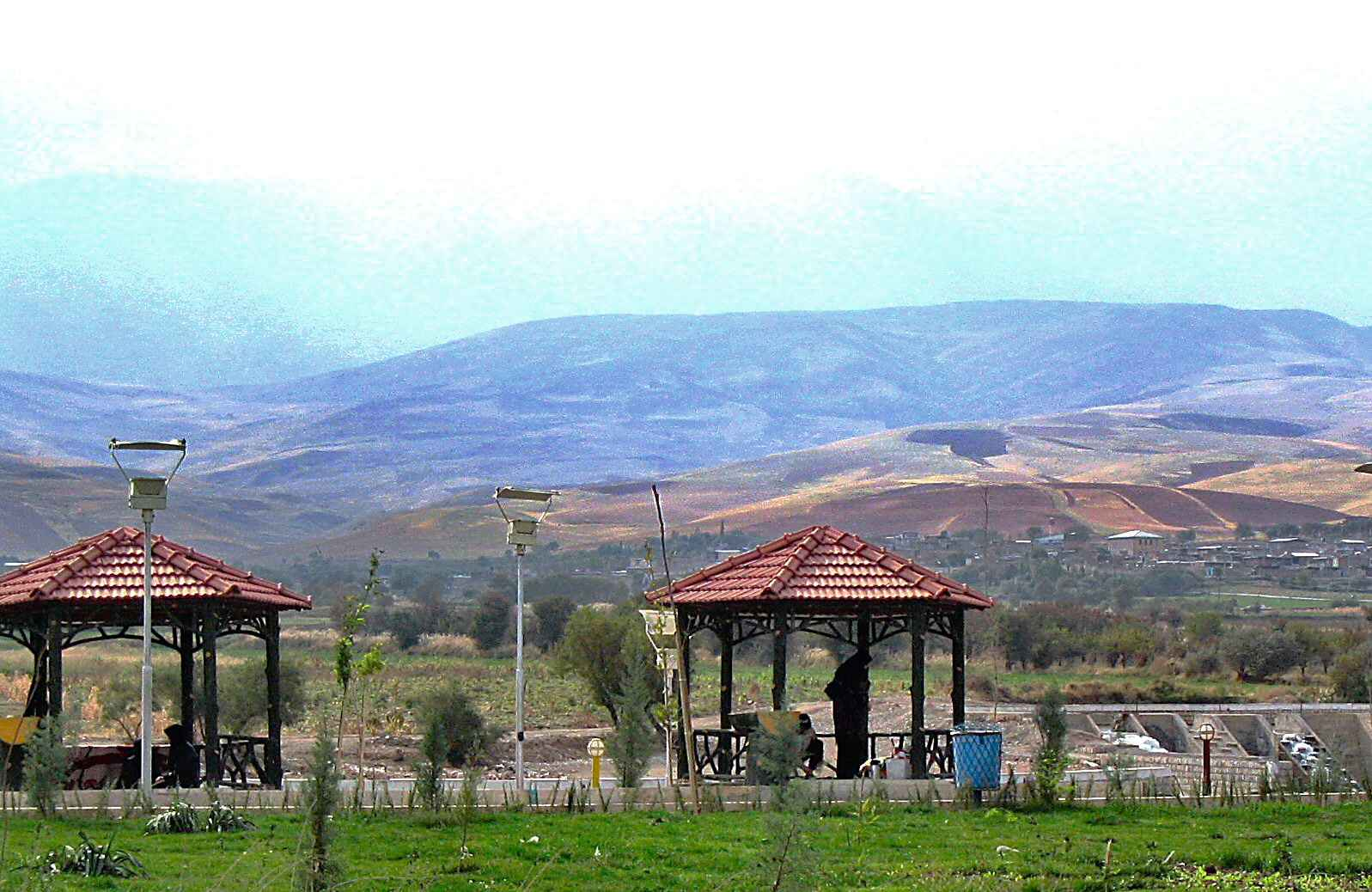
A view of Goldasht Parklands and agricultural fields of the Silakhor Plain in southwest Borujerd

== Geography ==
Silakhor is a grassland plain expanded northwest to south east along with the elevated reliefs of Zagros mountains. Starting 15 km north of the city of Borujerd in Oshtorinan District, this large geographical feature ends in south of Azna county. Silakhor is divided into two sections: Upper Silakhor and Lower Silakhor. Upper Silakhor is a smaller area located between Oshtorinan town and Borujerd city. Lower Silakhor starts from Borujerd city and after passing the town of Dorud, it ends in south of Azna town where Oshtorankuh is located.

== Geology ==
Geology of Silakhor is important as this plain is a border of Zagros and Central Iran tectonic plates.

=== Earthquakes ===
Being the marginal junction of Elevated Zagros and the Inner Highlands, Silakhor is an active earthquake zone. The Trans-Zagros Fault has caused several heavy earthquakes there. Between 6,000–8,000 fatalities were caused by the 7.3 M_{L} Borujerd earthquake that occurred south of Borujerd on January 23, 1909. Later, the 6.1 M_{w} Borujerd earthquake occurred on March 31, 2006.
