= Women's Park of Borujerd =

Urban park in Iran

The Women's Park of Borujerd (Persian: پارک بانوان بروجرد pārke bānovāne borūjerd) is an urban park in the city of Borujerd, in the province of Lorestan, western Iran. Established in May 2001, according to Iran’s Cultural Heritage News Agency (CHN), the Women’s park is the first park in Iran specifically designed for and dedicated to women in Iran. Adult men are not allowed in.
