= Soltani Mosque of Borujerd =

Mosque in Borujerd, Lorestan, Iran

- مسجد شاه بروجرد
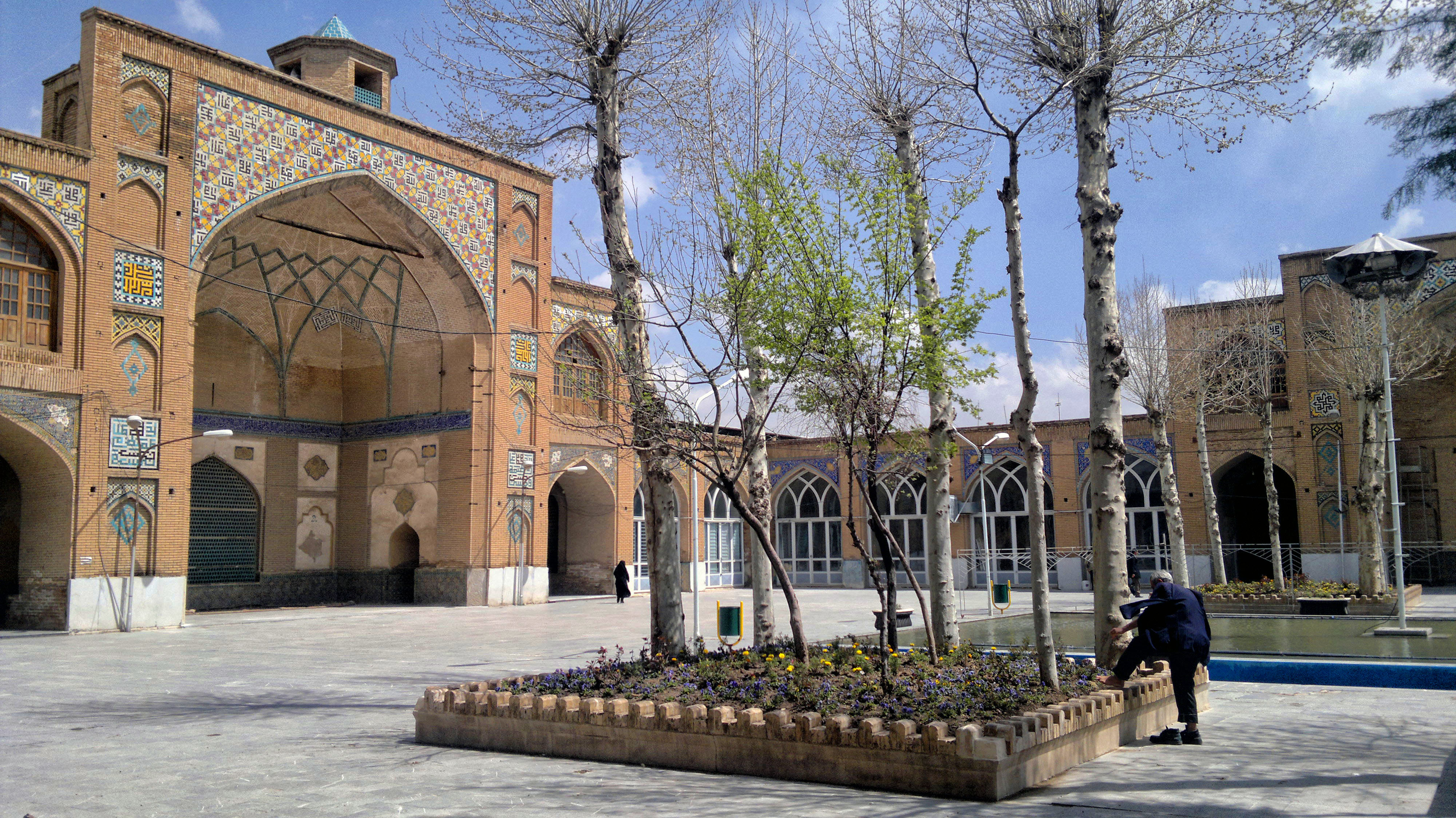
- The mosque sahn

- Location of the mosque in Iran

Religion
- Affiliation: Shia (Twelver)
- Ecclesiastical or organisational status: Mosque
- Status: Active

Location
- Location: Borujerd, Lorestan
- Country: Iran
- Coordinates: 33°53′41″N 48°45′32″E

Architecture
- Type: Mosque architecture
- Style: Safavid; Qajar
- Completed: Safavid era; 1795 (iwan, west); 1832 (decree, iwan, west); 1874 (iwan, north); 1879 (inscription, iwan, north)

Specifications
- Site area: 7,000 m^{2} (75,000 sq ft)
- Materials: Bricks; plaster; tiles

Iran National Heritage List
- Official name: Soltani Mosque of Borujerd
- Type: Mosque
- Designated: 1968
- Reference no.: 394
- Conservation organization: Cultural Heritage, Handicrafts and Tourism Organization of Iran

The Soltani Mosque of Borujerd (Persian: مسجد شاه بروجرد), also known as the Imam Khomeini Mosque of Borujerd (romanised: Masjed-e Imam Khomeini) and the Shah Mosque of Borujerd (romanised: Masjed Shah), is a Twelver Shi'ite mosque in central Borujerd, Lorestan province, western Iran.

The mosque was added to the Iran National Heritage List on 19 November 1968, administered by the Cultural Heritage, Handicrafts and Tourism Organization of Iran.

== Overview ==
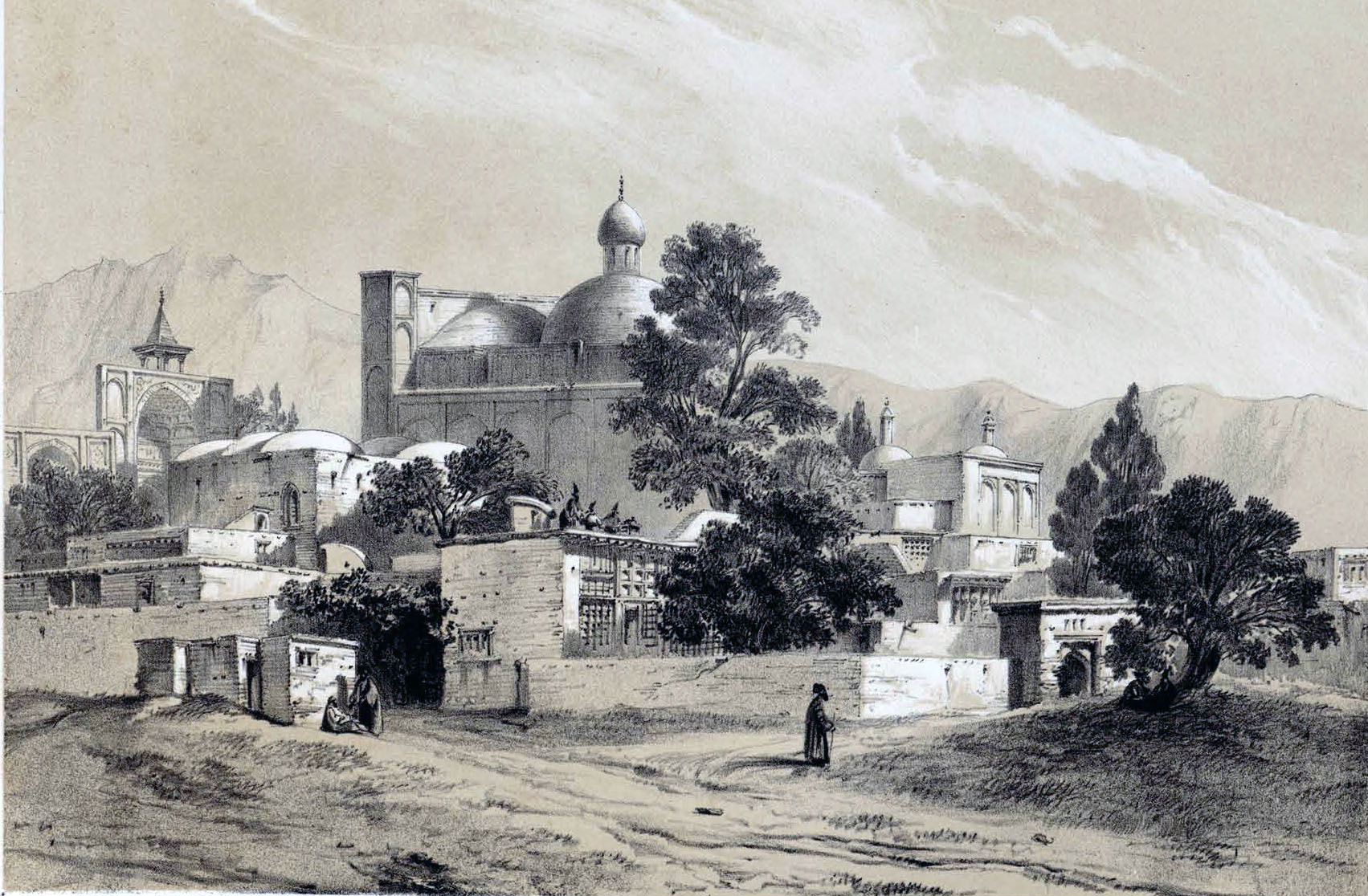
The mosque visible in a drawing of Borujerd by Eugène Flandin, 1840

The mosque was built in the Safavid era on top of the ruins of an older mosque that was probably built in the 10th century CE. The Safavid-era mosque was extensively renovated and extended during the Qajar era to become one of the largest mosques in Iran. Soltani means "related to Sultan," and likely refers to Fath-Ali Shah Qajar, who ordered the mosque to be rebuilt.

The Soltani Mosque of Borujerd was badly damaged during the 2006 Borujerd earthquake and partial restoration works were completed in 2022.

== Architecture ==
The mosque sahn measures 61 by 47 square metres (660 by 510 sq ft) and has a pool in the center. The northern iwan has an arched ceiling, adorned with plaster and tile works. On the entrance door is an inscription from the Prophet Mohammad and marks the date as 1291 AH (1874/1875 CE). The mosque has 16 chambers with carved doors. There is an inscription in the southern porch, dating from the rule of Fath-Ali Shah, that reveals that during the governorship of Mohammad Taqi Mirza, bakers were exempted from paying tax. Grand Ayatollah Hossein Borujerdi, who was the worldwide spiritual leader of the Shi'ite sect, taught theology from the mosque.

== Gallery ==
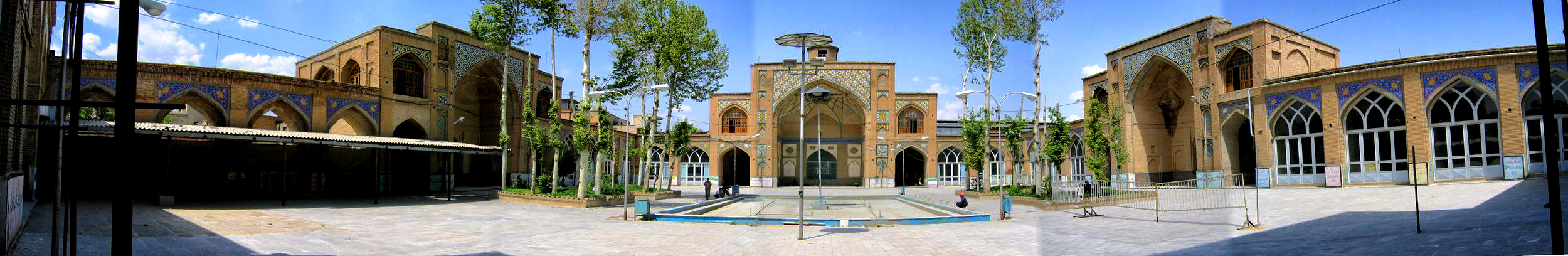
Main sahn of the mosque

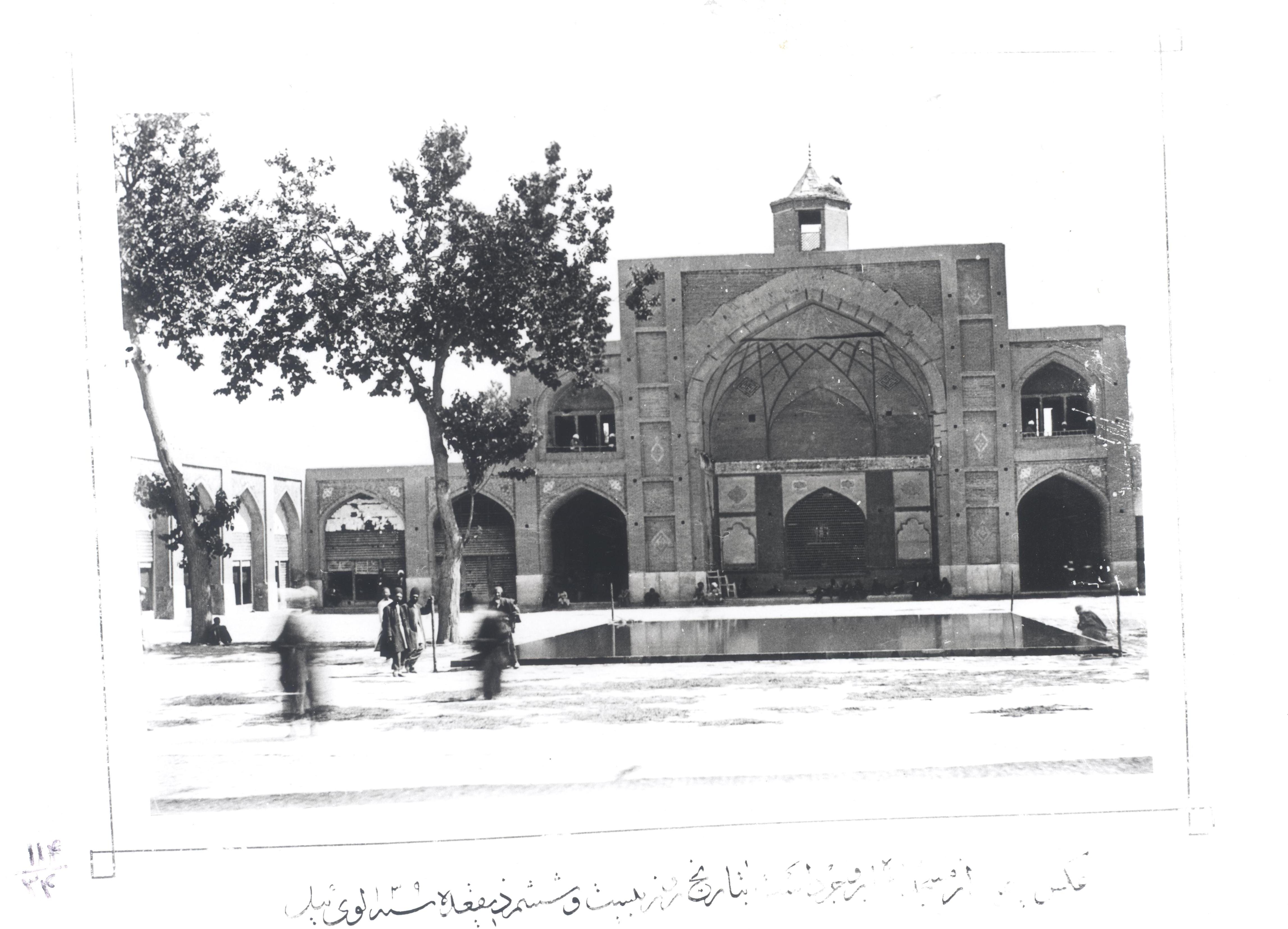
Photograph of the mosque dated 22 June 1892

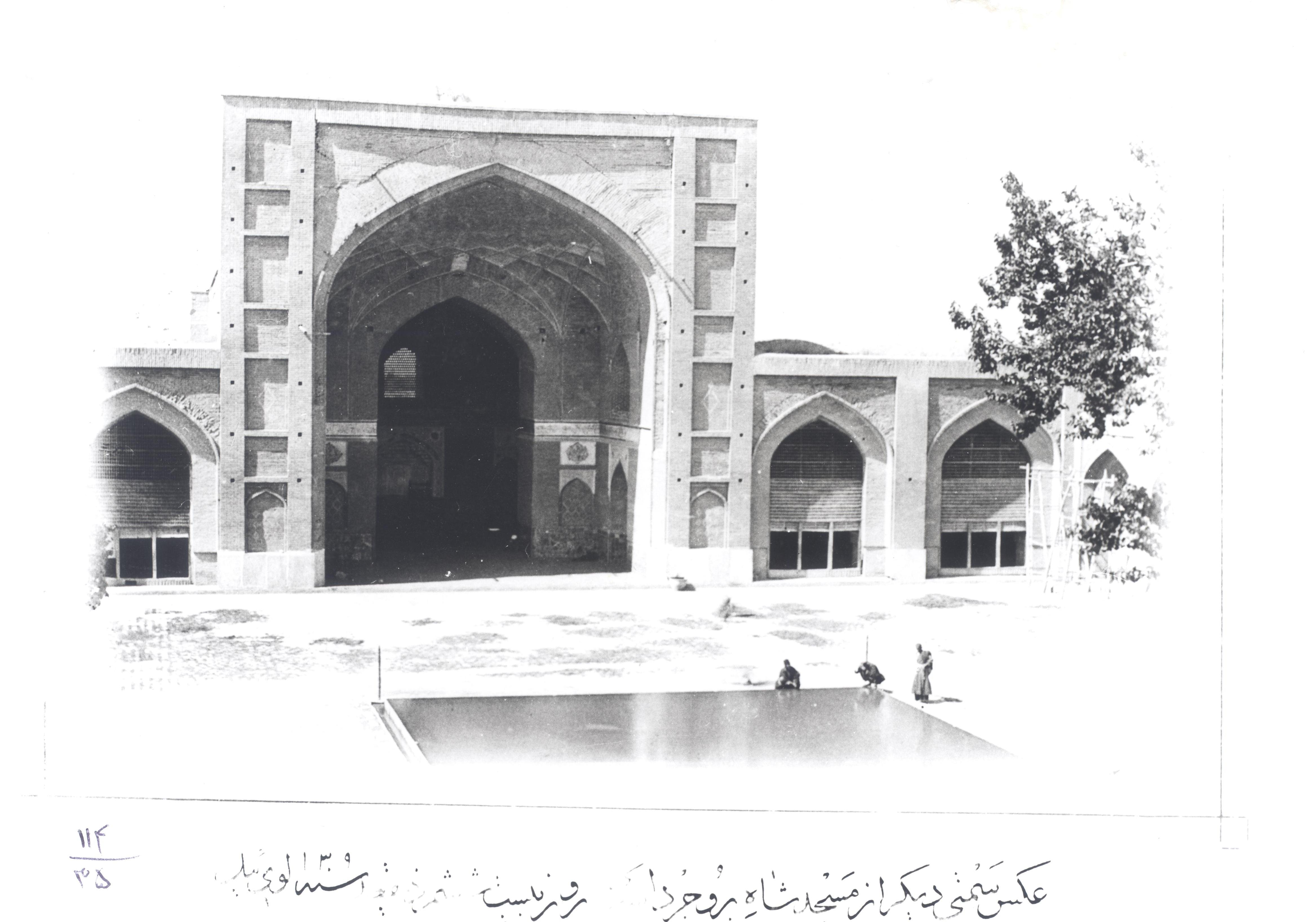
Photograph of the mosque dated 22 June 1892

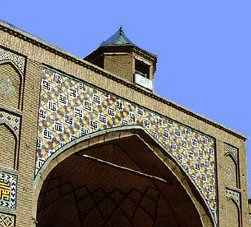
Northern iwan of the mosque with a place on top for Azaan

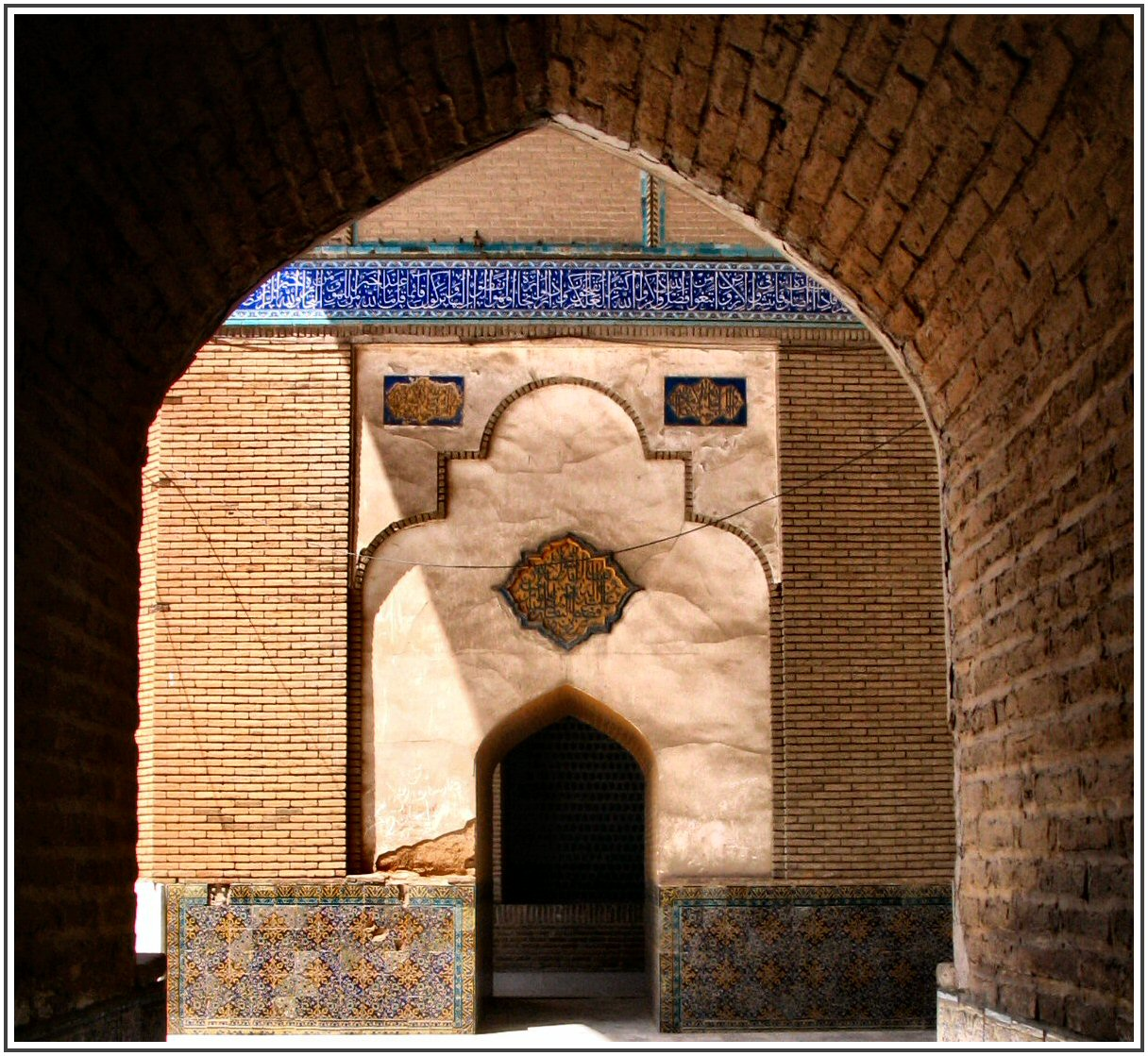
Details on the northern iwan

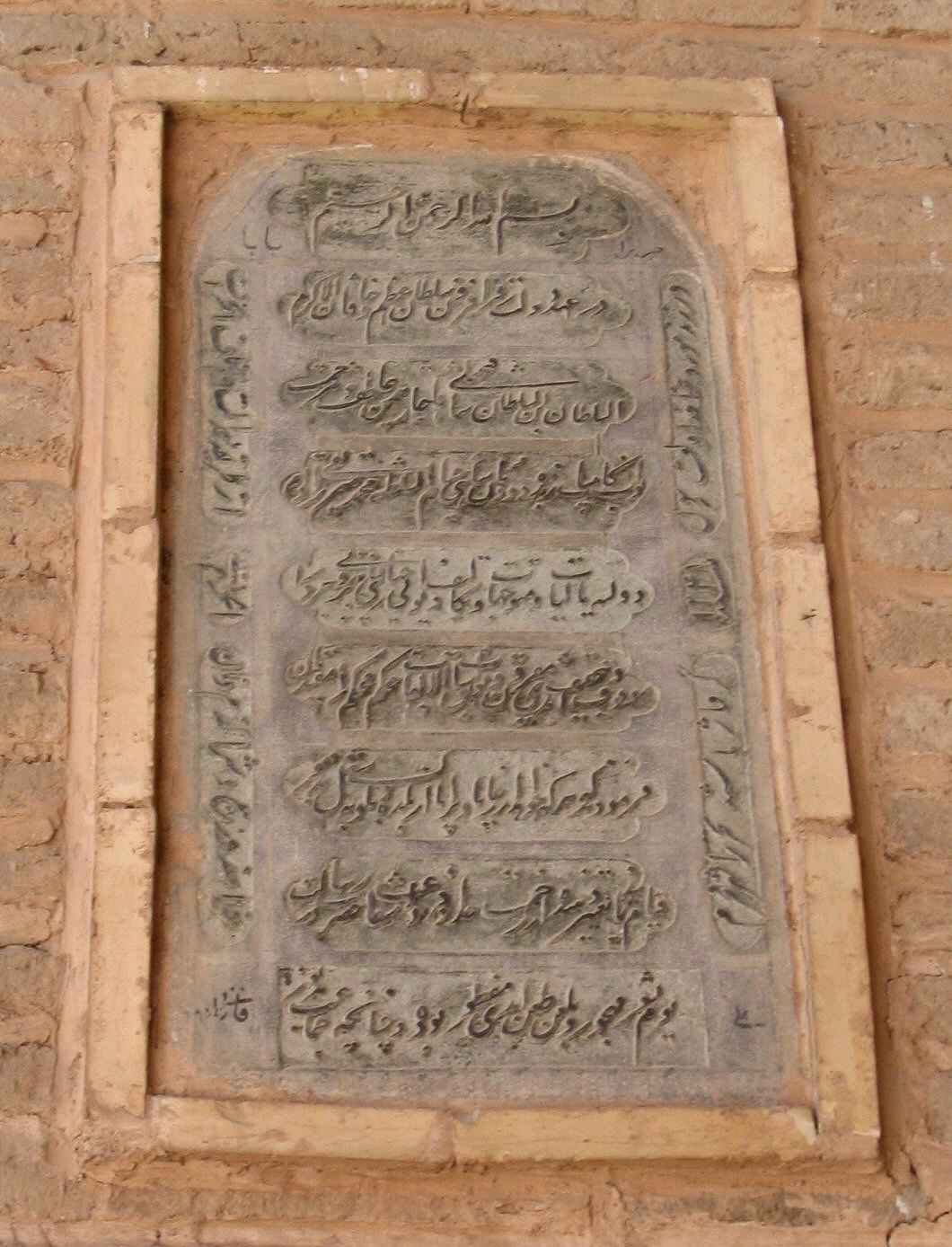
Qajar era inscriptions

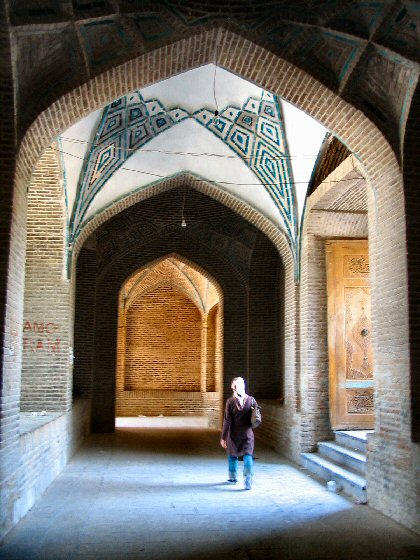
Iwan interior detail

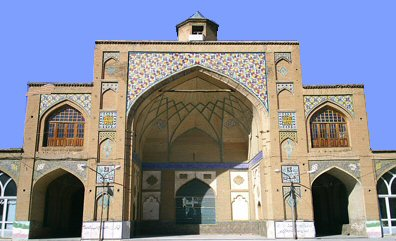
Northern view

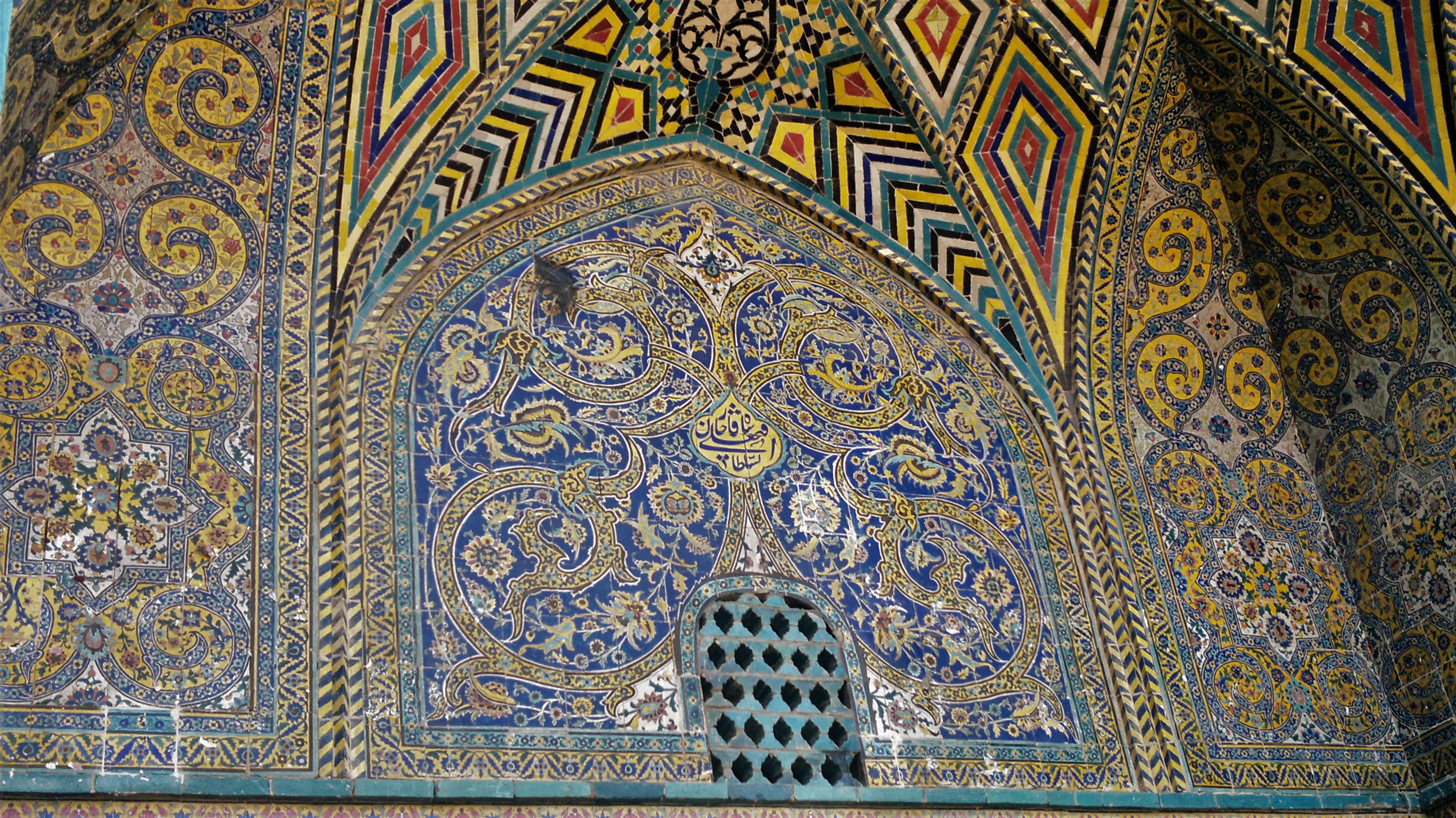
Detail of the interior tiling

== See also ==
- Shia Islam in Iran
- List of mosques in Iran
- Husayn Burujardi
