= 1909 Borujerd earthquake =

- Location within Iran
- UTC time: 1909-01-23 02:48:28
- ISC event: 16958011
- USGS-ANSS: ComCat
- Local date: 23 January 1909
- Local time: 08:18
- Magnitude: M_{L} 7.3
- Epicenter: 33.0°N 53.0°E
- Areas affected: Iran
- Max. intensity: MMI IX (Violent)
- Casualties: 6,000–8,000 dead

The 1909 Borujerd earthquake also known as Silakhor earthquake occurred in Silakhor plain (in the south of today's Borujerd County), Qajar Iran on January 23. Around 8,000 fatalities were caused directly from the magnitude 7.3 earthquake. An indefinite number of aftershocks continued for six months after the main shock. The section on this fault ruptured was the same as the main rupture zone of the 2006 Borujerd earthquake.

== Earthquake ==
The earthquake caused 40 kilometers (25 mi) of visible surface faulting. As no contemporary measurements of the fault scarp took place, the amount of displacement is unknown. The vertical displacement is believed to have exceeded 1 m (3 ft 3 in). The possibility of strike-slip displacement associated with the earthquake has not been established yet. The earthquake ruptured a branch of the Main Recent Fault; a right-lateral strike-slip feature trending northwest. The southern section of the Main Recent Fault from Dorud to Borujerd ruptured during this earthquake. Alongside the 1909 earthquake, events in 1957, 1958 and 2006 are associated with this fault or its splay branches. Earthquakes of M_{w} 7.0 or larger in the Zagros mountains are a rare occurrence; a majority of earthquakes only reach up to about M_{w} 6.5. The only other earthquake larger than M_{w} 7.0 occurred on 12 November 2017 at M_{w} 7.3.

== Damage ==
Sixty villages within the region were either completely destroyed or damaged beyond repair. Casualties were extensive, occurring in 130 individual villages. However, damage was contained within a 40,000 square kilometres (15,000 sq mi) area. Eight thousand were killed in this sector along with several thousand animals. Damage was worst within the epicentral area (Silakhor Valley) and surrounding valleys populated by domestic tribes. Signs of ground failure and landslides was evident for another 20–30 kilometres (12–19 mi) southeast of the epicenter.

The Persian Constitutional Revolution which brought turmoil and chaos across the country was underway when the earthquake occurred. Contact between authority bodies was irregular and inadequate. This may have contributed to unofficial information about the earthquake reaching Tehran, three weeks after the earthquake, through diplomatic messengers. Following a coup d'état in 1908, nearly all press companies were censored while those allowed to run published at inconsistent monthly or quarterly intervals. Hence, the Iranian press only reported the true scale of devastation in late April 1909. Due to the earthquake's far-reaching felt area, being felt in the Caucasus, Turkey and Baghdad, it was reported in the European press, although there was no information about its impact in the epicenter region.

== See also ==
- List of earthquakes in 1909
- List of earthquakes in Iran
