= Bazaar of Borujerd =

Bazaar in Borujerd, Iran

- بازار بروجرد
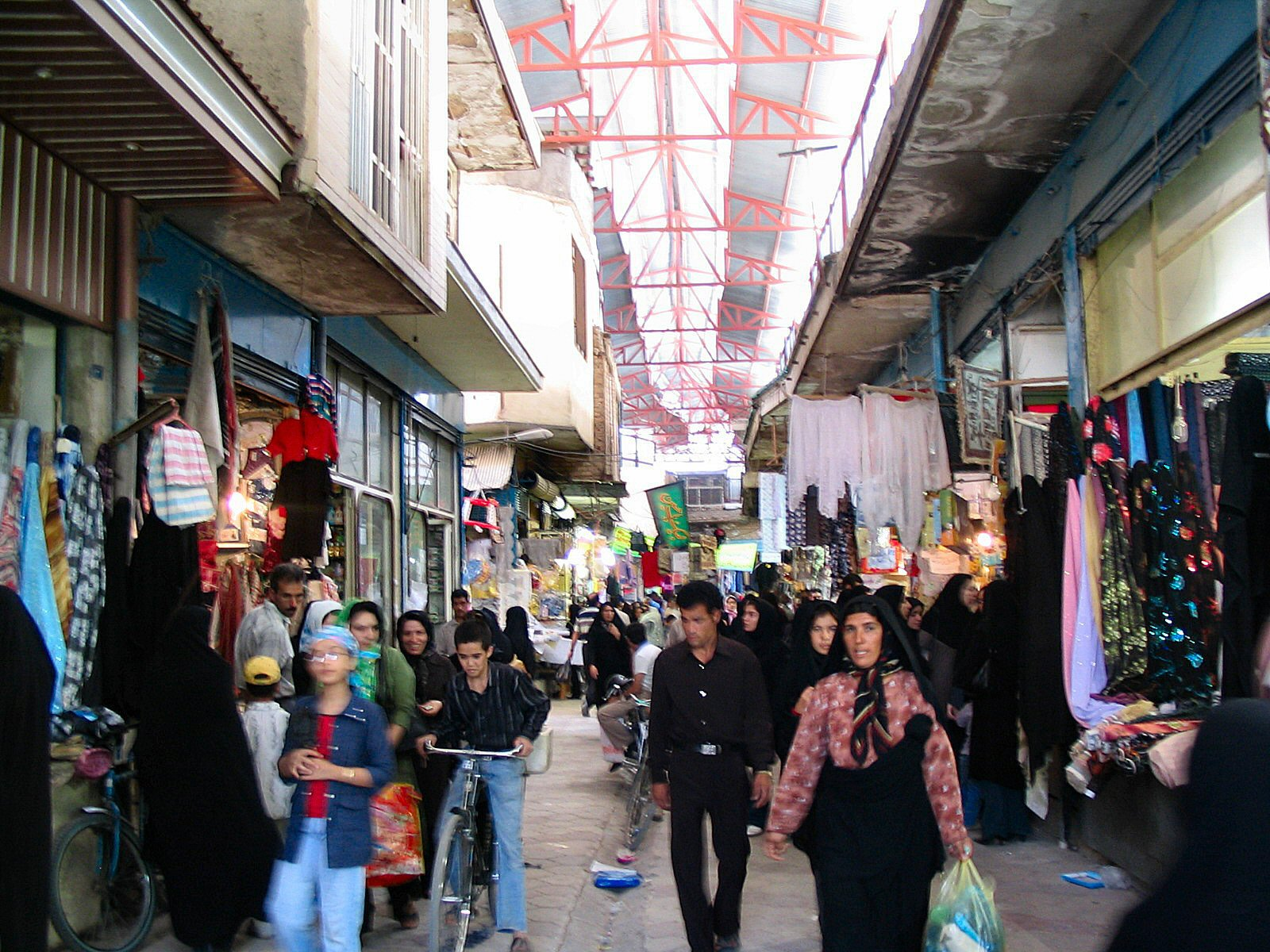
- Interactive map of the Bazaar of Borujerd area

General information
- Location: Borujerd, Iran

Bazaar of Borujerd is located in the centre of the city and consists of Rasteh Bazaars and Caravanserais.

A Rasteh Bazaar is a lane with covered roof usually with shops and workshops of a particular profession. Some of the important Rasteh Bazaars of Borujerd are:

- Bazaare Chelengarha for blacksmiths
- Bazaare Ghofl Sazha for locksmiths
- Bazaare Kaftar Forushha for birds and pigeons
- Bazaare Yahoodiha or Jews Bazaar

== See also ==
- Economy of Iran
- Iranian architecture
