= Darb-e Astaneh =

Darb-e Astaneh درب آستانه
- Village
- Location within Iran
- Coordinates: 33°24′51″N 49°08′35″E
- Country: Iran
- Province: Lorestan
- County: Dorud
- Bakhsh: Central
- Rural District: Heshmatabad

Population (2006)
  - Total: 242
- Time zone: UTC+3:30 (IRST)
  - Summer (DST): UTC+4:30 (IRDT)

Darb-e Astaneh (Persian: درب آستانه, also Romanized as Darb-e Āstāneh, Darb Āstāneh, and Dar Āstāneh) is a village in Heshmatabad Rural District, in the Central District of Dorud County, Lorestan Province, Iran. At the 2006 census, its population was 242, in 50 families.
