= Seyyedi =

Seyyedi (Persian: صیدی or سیدی) may refer to

== Villages in Iran ==
- Cham Seyyedi-ye Olya
- Cham Seyyedi-ye Sofla
- Cham Seyyedi-ye Vosta
- Eshkali Seyyedi
- Javad-e Seyyedi
- Kamarsheh Seyyedi Dallah
- Seyyedi Bazar
- Seyd Beyg
- Sufi Seyyedi

== Surnames ==
- Houman Seyyedi (born 1980), Iranian actor and filmmaker

== See also ==
- Seyyed
- Seydi (disambiguation)
