= Absardeh =

Absardeh or Ab Sardeh (Persian: آب سَردِۀ) may refer to:

- Ab Sardeh, Chaharmahal and Bakhtiari
- Absardeh, Aligudarz, a village in Aligudarz County, Lorestan Province, Iran
- Kalateh Absardeh, a village in Borujerd County, Lorestan Province, Iran
- Ab Sardeh-ye Sofla, a village in Borujerd County, Lorestan Province, Iran
- Qaleh-ye Absardeh, a village in Borujerd County, Lorestan Province, Iran
- Absardeh, Khorramabad, a village in Khorramabad County, Lorestan Province, Iran
