= Dar Tut, Lorestan =

Village in Lorestan province, Iran

Dar Tut Persian: دارتوت
- Village
- Location within Iran
- Coordinates: 33°37′40″N 48°47′30″E
- Country: Iran
- Province: Lorestan
- County: Borujerd
- District: Shirvan
- Rural District: Shirvan-e Gharbi

Population (2016)
  - Total: 271
- Time zone: UTC+3:30 (IRST)

Dar Tut (Persian: دارتوت) (Note: Also romanized as Dār Tūt and Dār-e Tūt; formerly known as Darti (دارتي), also romanized as Dārtī) is a village in Shirvan-e Gharbi Rural District of Shirvan District in Borujerd County, Lorestan province, Iran.

== Demographics ==
=== Population ===
At the time of the 2006 National Census, the village's population, as Darti, was 432 in 107 households, when it was in Shirvan Rural District (Note: Renamed Shirvan-e Sharqi Rural District) of the Central District. The following census in 2011 counted 312 people in 84 households, by which time the village was listed as Dar Tut. The 2016 census measured the population of the village as 271 people in 79 households.

In 2021, the rural district was separated from the district in the formation of Shirvan District and renamed Shirvan-e Sharqi Rural District. Dar Tut was transferred to Shirvan-e Gharbi Rural District created in the new district.
