= Ab Dar, Lorestan =

Village in Lorestan province, Iran

Ab Dar Persian: ابدر
- Village
- Location within Iran
- Coordinates: 33°42′05″N 48°47′53″E
- Country: Iran
- Province: Lorestan
- County: Borujerd
- District: Shirvan
- Rural District: Shirvan-e Gharbi

Population (2016)
  - Total: 79
- Time zone: UTC+3:30 (IRST)

Ab Dar (Persian: ابدر) (Note: Also romanized as Āb Dar and Ābdār) is a village in Shirvan-e Gharbi Rural District of Shirvan District in Borujerd County, Lorestan province, Iran.

== Demographics ==
=== Population ===
At the time of the 2006 National Census, the village's population was 91 in 19 households, when it was in Shirvan Rural District (Note: Renamed Shirvan-e Sharqi Rural District) of the Central District. The following census in 2011 counted 93 people in 25 households. The 2016 census measured the population of the village as 79 people in 22 households.

In 2021, the rural district was separated from the district in the formation of Shirvan District and renamed Shirvan-e Sharqi Rural District. Ab Dar was transferred to Shirvan-e Gharbi Rural District created in the new district.
