= Khan Amir, Lorestan =

Village in Lorestan province, Iran

Khan Amir Persian: خان امير
- Village
- Location within Iran
- Coordinates: 33°38′23″N 48°45′49″E
- Country: Iran
- Province: Lorestan
- County: Borujerd
- District: Shirvan
- Rural District: Shirvan-e Gharbi

Population (2016)
  - Total: 68
- Time zone: UTC+3:30 (IRST)

Khan Amir (Persian: خان امير) (Note: Also romanized as Khān Amīr; also known as Khān Mīr) is a village in Shirvan-e Gharbi Rural District of Shirvan District in Borujerd County, Lorestan province, Iran.

== Demographics ==
=== Population ===
At the time of the 2006 National Census, the village's population was 128 in 24 households, when it was in Shirvan Rural District (Note: Renamed Shirvan-e Sharqi Rural District) of the Central District. The following census in 2011 counted 115 people in 25 households. The 2016 census measured the population of the village as 68 people in 19 households.

In 2021, the rural district was separated from the district in the formation of Shirvan District and renamed Shirvan-e Sharqi Rural District. Khan Amir was transferred to Shirvan-e Gharbi Rural District created in the new district.
