= Deh Sorkheh, Borujerd =

Village in Lorestan province, Iran

Deh Sorkheh Persian: ده سرخه
- Village
- Location within Iran
- Coordinates: 33°39′31″N 48°45′22″E
- Country: Iran
- Province: Lorestan
- County: Borujerd
- District: Shirvan
- Rural District: Shirvan-e Gharbi

Population (2016)
  - Total: 118
- Time zone: UTC+3:30 (IRST)

Deh Sorkheh (Persian: ده سرخه) (Note: Also romanized as Deh Sorkheh; also known as Darreh Sorkheh) is a village in Shirvan-e Gharbi Rural District of Shirvan District in Borujerd County, Lorestan province, Iran.

== Demographics ==
=== Population ===
At the time of the 2006 National Census, the village's population was 88 in 17 households, when it was in Shirvan Rural District (Note: Renamed Shirvan-e Sharqi Rural District) of the Central District. The following census in 2011 counted 49 people in 15 households. The 2016 census measured the population of the village as 118 people in 40 households.

In 2021, the rural district was separated from the district in the formation of Shirvan District and renamed Shirvan-e Sharqi Rural District. Deh Sorkheh was transferred to Shirvan-e Gharbi Rural District created in the new district.
