= Darb-e Astaneh Khalid Ebn Ali =

Village in Lorestan province, Iran

Darb-e Astaneh Khalid Ebn Ali Persian: درب استانه خالدبن علي
- Village
- Location within Iran
- Coordinates: 33°42′15″N 48°48′37″E
- Country: Iran
- Province: Lorestan
- County: Borujerd
- District: Shirvan
- Rural District: Shirvan-e Gharbi

Population (2016)
  - Total: 711
- Time zone: UTC+3:30 (IRST)

Darb-e Astaneh Khalid Ebn Ali (Persian: درب استانه خالدبن علي) (Note: Also romanized as Darb-e Āstāneh Khālid Ebn ʿAlī; also known as Darb Āstāneh, Darb-e Āstāneh, Darreh Suna, and Darreh-ye Sūneh) is a village in Shirvan-e Gharbi Rural District of Shirvan District in Borujerd County, Lorestan province, Iran.

The region is seismically active. The village was the center of the 2006 Borujerd earthquake, and was close to the center of the 1909 Silakhor earthquake, the latter of which killed 8,000 people.

== Demographics ==
=== Population ===
At the time of the 2006 National Census, the village's population was 603 in 148 households, when it was in Shirvan Rural District (Note: Renamed Shirvan-e Sharqi Rural District) of the Central District. The following census in 2011 counted 808 people in 224 households. The 2016 census measured the population of the village as 711 people in 228 households.

In 2021, the rural district was separated from the district in the formation of Shirvan District and renamed Shirvan-e Sharqi Rural District. Darb-e Astaneh Khalid Ebn Ali was transferred to Shirvan-e Gharbi Rural District created in the new district.
