= Deh Sefid, Borujerd =

Village in Lorestan province, Iran

Deh Sefid Persian: ده سفيد
- Village
- Location within Iran
- Country: Iran
- Province: Lorestan
- County: Borujerd
- District: Shirvan
- Rural District: Shirvan-e Gharbi

Population (2016)
  - Total: 35
- Time zone: UTC+3:30 (IRST)

Deh Sefid (Persian: ده سفيد) (Note: Also romanized as Deh Sefīd) is a village in Shirvan-e Gharbi Rural District of Shirvan District in Borujerd County, Lorestan province, Iran.

== Demographics ==
=== Population ===
At the time of the 2006 National Census, the village's population was 60 in 10 households, when it was in Shirvan Rural District (Note: Renamed Shirvan-e Sharqi Rural District) of the Central District. The following census in 2011 counted 24 people in seven households. The 2016 census measured the population of the village as 35 people in nine households.

In 2021, the rural district was separated from the district in the formation of Shirvan District and renamed Shirvan-e Sharqi Rural District. Deh Sefid was transferred to Shirvan-e Gharbi Rural District created in the new district.
