= Besri, Lorestan =

Village in Lorestan province, Iran

Besri Persian: بصري
- Village
- Location within Iran
- Coordinates: 33°44′26″N 48°49′14″E
- Country: Iran
- Province: Lorestan
- County: Borujerd
- District: Shirvan
- Rural District: Shirvan-e Gharbi

Population (2016)
  - Total: 799
- Time zone: UTC+3:30 (IRST)

Besri (Persian: بصري) (Note: Also romanized as Başarī and Beşrī; also known as Başran, Başrān, Basren, and Basri (بسري)) is a village in Shirvan-e Gharbi Rural District of Shirvan District in Borujerd County, Lorestan province, Iran.

== Demographics ==
=== Population ===
At the time of the 2006 National Census, the village's population was 1,092 in 252 households, when it was in Shirvan Rural District (Note: Renamed Shirvan-e Sharqi Rural District) of the Central District. The following census in 2011 counted 966 people in 252 households. The 2016 census measured the population of the village as 799 people in 221 households.

In 2021, the rural district was separated from the district in the formation of Shirvan District and renamed Shirvan-e Sharqi Rural District. Besri was transferred to Shirvan-e Gharbi Rural District created in the new district.
