= Darreh Kabud =

Village in Lorestan province, Iran

Darreh Kabud Persian: دره كبود
- Village
- Location within Iran
- Coordinates: 33°40′04″N 48°44′22″E
- Country: Iran
- Province: Lorestan
- County: Borujerd
- District: Shirvan
- Rural District: Shirvan-e Gharbi

Population (2016)
  - Total: 108
- Time zone: UTC+3:30 (IRST)

Darreh Kabud (Persian: دره كبود) (Note: Also romanized as Darreh Kabūd; also known as Darreh Ḩoseynī and Darreh Kabūd 'Olyā) is a village in Shirvan-e Gharbi Rural District of Shirvan District in Borujerd County, Lorestan province, Iran.

== Demographics ==
=== Population ===
At the time of the 2006 National Census, the village's population was 184 in 39 households, when it was in Shirvan Rural District (Note: Renamed Shirvan-e Sharqi Rural District) of the Central District. The following census in 2011 counted 137 people in 35 households. The 2016 census measured the population of the village as 108 people in 30 households.

In 2021, the rural district was separated from the district in the formation of Shirvan District and renamed Shirvan-e Sharqi Rural District. Darreh Kabud was transferred to Shirvan-e Gharbi Rural District created in the new district.
