= Chegeni Kosh =

Village in Lorestan province, Iran

Chegeni Kosh Persian: چگني كش
- Village
- Location within Iran
- Coordinates: 33°46′28″N 48°44′35″E
- Country: Iran
- Province: Lorestan
- County: Borujerd
- District: Shirvan
- Rural District: Shirvan-e Gharbi

Population (2016)
  - Total: 605
- Time zone: UTC+3:30 (IRST)

Chegeni Kosh (Persian: چگني كش) (Note: Also romanized as Chegenī Kosh and Chegnī Kosh; also known as Chagīneh Kosh, Chagīnī Kosh, Chegini Kosh, Chegīnī Kosh, and Chigini Kush) is a village in Shirvan-e Gharbi Rural District of Shirvan District in Borujerd County, Lorestan province, Iran.

== Demographics ==
=== Population ===
At the time of the 2006 National Census, the village's population was 636 in 143 households, when it was in Shirvan Rural District (Note: Renamed Shirvan-e Sharqi Rural District) of the Central District. The following census in 2011 counted 619 people in 173 households. The 2016 census measured the population of the village as 605 people in 172 households.

In 2021, the rural district was separated from the district in the formation of Shirvan District and renamed Shirvan-e Sharqi Rural District. Chegeni Kosh was transferred to Shirvan-e Gharbi Rural District created in the new district.
