= Pir Sharif =

Village in Lorestan province, Iran

Pir Sharif Persian: پيرشريف
- Village
- Location within Iran
- Coordinates: 33°42′05″N 48°42′39″E
- Country: Iran
- Province: Lorestan
- County: Borujerd
- District: Shirvan
- Rural District: Shirvan-e Gharbi

Population (2016)
  - Total: 16
- Time zone: UTC+3:30 (IRST)

Pir Sharif (Persian: پيرشريف) (Note: Also romanized as Pīr Sharīf; also known as Bīrsharīf, Darreh Moḩammad-e ‘Alī, Darreh-ye Moḩammad ‘Alī, Darreh-ye Moḩammad-e ‘Ālī, Thāf, and Zāf) is a village in Shirvan-e Gharbi Rural District of Shirvan District in Borujerd County, Lorestan province, Iran.

== Demographics ==
=== Population ===
At the time of the 2006 National Census, the village's population was 33 in six households, when it was in Shirvan Rural District (Note: Renamed Shirvan-e Sharqi Rural District) of the Central District. The following census in 2011 counted 21 people in five households. The 2016 census measured the population of the village as 16 people in five households.

In 2021, the rural district was separated from the district in the formation of Shirvan District and renamed Shirvan-e Sharqi Rural District. Pir Sharif was transferred to Shirvan-e Gharbi Rural District created in the new district.
