= Alkabad =

Village in Lorestan province, Iran

Alkabad Persian: الك اباد
- Village
- Location within Iran
- Coordinates: 33°43′39″N 48°49′28″E
- Country: Iran
- Province: Lorestan
- County: Borujerd
- District: Shirvan
- Rural District: Shirvan-e Gharbi

Population (2016)
  - Total: 566
- Time zone: UTC+3:30 (IRST)

Alkabad (Persian: الك اباد) (Note: Also romanized as Alakābād and Alkābād; also known as Aulād Qibād and Owlād-e Qobād) is a village in Shirvan-e Gharbi Rural District of Shirvan District in Borujerd County, Lorestan province, Iran.

== Demographics ==
=== Population ===
At the time of the 2006 National Census, the village's population was 649 in 169 households, when it was in Shirvan Rural District (Note: Renamed Shirvan-e Sharqi Rural District) of the Central District. The following census in 2011 counted 607 people in 183 households. The 2016 census measured the population of the village as 566 people in 175 households.

In 2021, the rural district was separated from the district in the formation of Shirvan District and renamed Shirvan-e Sharqi Rural District. Alkabad was transferred to Shirvan-e Gharbi Rural District created in the new district.
