= Sinabad, Lorestan =

Village in Lorestan province, Iran

Sinabad Persian: سين اباد
- Village
- Location within Iran
- Coordinates: 33°42′23″N 48°49′22″E
- Country: Iran
- Province: Lorestan
- County: Borujerd
- District: Shirvan
- Rural District: Shirvan-e Gharbi

Population (2016)
  - Total: 39
- Time zone: UTC+3:30 (IRST)

Sinabad (Persian: سين اباد) (Note: Also romanized as Sīnābād; also known as Senābād) is a village in Shirvan-e Gharbi Rural District of Shirvan District in Borujerd County, Lorestan province, Iran.

== Demographics ==
=== Population ===
At the time of the 2006 National Census, the village's population was 127 in 30 households, when it was in Shirvan Rural District (Note: Renamed Shirvan-e Sharqi Rural District) of the Central District. The following census in 2011 counted 31 people in 10 households. The 2016 census measured the population of the village as 39 people in 10 households.

In 2021, the rural district was separated from the district in the formation of Shirvan District and renamed Shirvan-e Sharqi Rural District. Sinabad was transferred to Shirvan-e Gharbi Rural District created in the new district.
