= Ud-e Mulla =

Village in Lorestan province, Iran

Ud-e Mulla Persian: عودمولا
- Village
- Location within Iran
- Coordinates: 33°39′00″N 48°45′19″E
- Country: Iran
- Province: Lorestan
- County: Borujerd
- District: Shirvan
- Rural District: Shirvan-e Gharbi

Population (2016)
  - Total: 55
- Time zone: UTC+3:30 (IRST)

Ud-e Mulla (Persian: عودمولا) (Note: Also romanized as ‘Ūd-e Mūllā; also known as Avanmalleh, Ogh Mūlāk, Oqūlāk, ‘Owd Mollā, ‘Owl Mollā, Own Mallah, Own Molla, ‘Ūd Mollā, Ud-e Molla, and ‘Ūd-e Mollā) is a village in Shirvan-e Gharbi Rural District of Shirvan District in Borujerd County, Lorestan province, Iran.

== Demographics ==
=== Population ===
At the time of the 2006 National Census, the village's population was 119 in 28 households, when it was in Shirvan Rural District (Note: Renamed Shirvan-e Sharqi Rural District) of the Central District. The following census in 2011 counted 75 people in 21 households. The 2016 census measured the population of the village as 55 people in 20 households.

In 2021, the rural district was separated from the district in the formation of Shirvan District and renamed Shirvan-e Sharqi Rural District. Ud-e Mulla was transferred to Shirvan-e Gharbi Rural District created in the new district.
