= Ganjineh =

Village in Lorestan province, Iran

Ganjineh Persian: گنجينه
- Village
- Location within Iran
- Coordinates: 33°45′35″N 48°46′39″E
- Country: Iran
- Province: Lorestan
- County: Borujerd
- District: Shirvan
- Rural District: Shirvan-e Gharbi

Population (2016)
  - Total: 1,004
- Time zone: UTC+3:30 (IRST)

Ganjineh (Persian: گنجينه) (Note: Also romanized as Ganjīneh; also known as Gachīneh and Gichineh) is a village in Shirvan-e Gharbi Rural District of Shirvan District in Borujerd County, Lorestan province, Iran.

== Demographics ==
=== Population ===
At the time of the 2006 National Census, the village's population was 946 in 241 households, when it was in Shirvan Rural District (Note: Renamed Shirvan-e Sharqi Rural District) of the Central District. The following census in 2011 counted 1,087 people in 312 households. The 2016 census measured the population of the village as 1,004 people in 296 households.

In 2021, the rural district was separated from the district in the formation of Shirvan District and renamed Shirvan-e Sharqi Rural District. Ganjineh was transferred to Shirvan-e Gharbi Rural District created in the new district.
