= Tang-e Mohammad Hajji =

Village in Lorestan province, Iran

Tang-e Mohammad Hajji Persian: تنگ محمدحاجي
- Village
- Location within Iran
- Coordinates: 33°44′06″N 48°45′16″E
- Country: Iran
- Province: Lorestan
- County: Borujerd
- District: Shirvan
- Rural District: Shirvan-e Gharbi

Population (2016)
  - Total: 122
- Time zone: UTC+3:30 (IRST)

Tang-e Mohammad Hajji (Persian: تنگ محمدحاجي) (Note: Also romanized as Tang-e Moḩammad Ḩājī and Tang-e Moḩammad Ḩājjī; also known as Moḩammad Ḩājī and Moḩammad Ḩājjī) is a village in Shirvan-e Gharbi Rural District of Shirvan District in Borujerd County, Lorestan province, Iran.

== Demographics ==
=== Population ===
At the time of the 2006 National Census, the village's population was 137 in 31 households, when it was in Shirvan Rural District (Note: Renamed Shirvan-e Sharqi Rural District) of the Central District. The following census in 2011 counted 105 people in 31 households. The 2016 census measured the population of the village as 122 people in 39 households.

In 2021, the rural district was separated from the district in the formation of Shirvan District and renamed Shirvan-e Sharqi Rural District. Tang-e Mohammad Hajji was transferred to Shirvan-e Gharbi Rural District created in the new district.
