= Dinarabad, Lorestan =

Village in Lorestan province, Iran

Dinarabad Persian: ديناراباد
- Village
- Location within Iran
- Coordinates: 33°43′21″N 48°47′35″E
- Country: Iran
- Province: Lorestan
- County: Borujerd
- District: Shirvan
- Rural District: Shirvan-e Gharbi

Population (2016)
  - Total: 410
- Time zone: UTC+3:30 (IRST)

Dinarabad (Persian: ديناراباد) (Note: Also romanized as Dīnārābād) is a village in Shirvan-e Gharbi Rural District of Shirvan District in Borujerd County, Lorestan province, Iran.

== Demographics ==
=== Population ===
At the time of the 2006 National Census, the village's population was 283 in 70 households, when it was in Shirvan Rural District (Note: Renamed Shirvan-e Sharqi Rural District) of the Central District. The following census in 2011 counted 378 people in 114 households. The 2016 census measured the population of the village as 410 people in 124 households.

In 2021, the rural district was separated from the district in the formation of Shirvan District and renamed Shirvan-e Sharqi Rural District. Dinarabad was transferred to Shirvan-e Gharbi Rural District created in the new district.
