= Korkor, Borujerd =

Village in Lorestan province, Iran

Korkor Persian: كركر
- Village
- Location within Iran
- Coordinates: 33°41′59″N 48°43′00″E
- Country: Iran
- Province: Lorestan
- County: Borujerd
- District: Shirvan
- Rural District: Shirvan-e Gharbi

Population (2016)
  - Total: 28
- Time zone: UTC+3:30 (IRST)

Korkor (Persian: كركر) (Note: Also romanized as Korḵor) is a village in Shirvan-e Gharbi Rural District of Shirvan District in Borujerd County, Lorestan province, Iran.

== Demographics ==
=== Population ===
At the time of the 2006 National Census, the village's population was 40 in nine households, when it was in Shirvan Rural District (Note: Renamed Shirvan-e Sharqi Rural District) of the Central District. The following census in 2011 counted 32 people in eight households. The 2016 census measured the population of the village as 28 people in eight households.

In 2021, the rural district was separated from the district in the formation of Shirvan District and renamed Shirvan-e Sharqi Rural District. Korkor was transferred to Shirvan-e Gharbi Rural District created in the new district.
