= Boz-e Azna =

Village in Lorestan province, Iran

Boz-e Azna Persian: بزازنا
- Village
- Location within Iran
- Coordinates: 33°44′28″N 48°47′43″E
- Country: Iran
- Province: Lorestan
- County: Borujerd
- District: Shirvan
- Rural District: Shirvan-e Gharbi

Population (2016)
  - Total: 905
- Time zone: UTC+3:30 (IRST)

Boz-e Azna (Persian: بزازنا) (Note: Also romanized as Bozāznā and Boz-e Aznā; also known as Būzāznāh) is a village in, and the capital of, Shirvan-e Gharbi Rural District in Shirvan District of Borujerd County, Lorestan province, Iran.

== Demographics ==
=== Population ===
At the time of the 2006 National Census, the village's population was 910 in 222 households, when it was in Shirvan Rural District (Note: Renamed Shirvan-e Sharqi Rural District) of the Central District. The following census in 2011 counted 952 people in 281 households. The 2016 census measured the population of the village as 905 people in 280 households.

In 2021, the rural district was separated from the district in the formation of Shirvan District and renamed Shirvan-e Sharqi Rural District. Boz-e Azna was transferred to Shirvan-e Gharbi Rural District created in the new district.
