= Qaleh Shekar =

Village in Lorestan province, Iran

Qaleh Shekar Persian: قلعه شكار
- Village
- Location within Iran
- Country: Iran
- Province: Lorestan
- County: Borujerd
- District: Shirvan
- Rural District: Shirvan-e Gharbi

Population (2016)
  - Total: 97
- Time zone: UTC+3:30 (IRST)

Qaleh Shekar (Persian: قلعه شكار) (Note: Also romanized as Qal‘eh Shekār) is a village in Shirvan-e Gharbi Rural District of Shirvan District in Borujerd County, Lorestan province, Iran.

== Demographics ==
=== Population ===
At the time of the 2006 National Census, the village's population was 162 in 42 households, when it was in Shirvan Rural District (Note: Renamed Shirvan-e Sharqi Rural District) of the Central District. The following census in 2011 counted 101 people in 31 households. The 2016 census measured the population of the village as 97 people in 29 households.

In 2021, the rural district was separated from the district in the formation of Shirvan District and renamed Shirvan-e Sharqi Rural District. Qaleh Shekar was transferred to Shirvan-e Gharbi Rural District created in the new district.
