= Kenarvand =

Village in Lorestan province, Iran

Kenarvand Persian: کناروند
- Village
- Location within Iran
- Coordinates: 33°41′01″N 48°43′43″E
- Country: Iran
- Province: Lorestan
- County: Borujerd
- District: Shirvan
- Rural District: Shirvan-e Gharbi

Population (2016)
  - Total: 76
- Time zone: UTC+3:30 (IRST)

Kenarvand (Persian: کناروند) (Note: Also romanized as Kenar Vand, Kenārvand, and Konārvand; formerly known as Gonarvand (گناروند), also romanized as Gonārvand; also known as Kanarwān, Konārvand-e Varkow, and Konārvan-e ‘Olyā) is a village in Shirvan-e Gharbi Rural District of Shirvan District in Borujerd County, Lorestan province, Iran.

== Demographics ==
=== Population ===
At the time of the 2006 National Census, the village's population, as Gonarvand, was 131 in 25 households, when it was in Shirvan Rural District (Note: Renamed Shirvan-e Sharqi Rural District) of the Central District. The following census in 2011 counted 99 people in 23 households, by which time the village was listed as Kenarvand. The 2016 census measured the population of the village as 76 people in 23 households.

In 2021, the rural district was separated from the district in the formation of Shirvan District and renamed Shirvan-e Sharqi Rural District. Kenarvand was transferred to Shirvan-e Gharbi Rural District created in the new district.
