= Shisheh, Lorestan =

Village in Lorestan province, Iran

Shisheh Persian: شيشه
- Village
- Location within Iran
- Coordinates: 33°50′29″N 48°46′27″E
- Country: Iran
- Province: Lorestan
- County: Borujerd
- District: Shirvan
- Rural District: Shirvan-e Sharqi

Population (2016)
  - Total: 357
- Time zone: UTC+3:30 (IRST)

Shisheh (Persian: شيشه) (Note: Also romanized as Shīsheh) is a village in Shirvan-e Sharqi Rural District (Note: Formerly Shirvan Rural District) of Shirvan District in Borujerd County, Lorestan province, Iran.

== Demographics ==
=== Population ===
At the time of the 2006 National Census, the village's population was 281 in 65 households, when it was in Hemmatabad Rural District of the Central District. The following census in 2011 counted 396 people in 104 households. The 2016 census measured the population of the village as 357 people in 104 households.

In 2021, the village was transferred to Shirvan-e Sharqi Rural District in the newly formed Shirvan District.
