= Qaleh-ye Mohammad =

Qaleh-ye Mohammad or Qaleh Mohammad (Persian: سيدمحمدقلعه) may refer to:

- Qaleh-ye Mohammad, Khuzestan
- Qaleh-ye Mohammad, Lorestan
- Qaleh-ye Mohammad, North Khorasan

== See also ==
- Qaleh-ye Mohammad Ali Khan
- Qaleh-ye Mohammad Ali Khan, North Khorasan
- Qaleh-ye Mohammad Zia
