= Qoroq, Lorestan =

Village in Lorestan province, Iran

Qoroq Persian: قرق
- Village
- Location within Iran
- Coordinates: 33°43′04″N 48°54′09″E
- Country: Iran
- Province: Lorestan
- County: Borujerd
- District: Shirvan
- Rural District: Shirvan-e Sharqi

Population (2016)
  - Total: 237
- Time zone: UTC+3:30 (IRST)

Qoroq (Persian: قرق) (Note: Also romanized as Qūruq) is a village in Shirvan-e Sharqi Rural District (Note: Formerly Shirvan Rural District) of Shirvan District in Borujerd County, Lorestan province, Iran.

== Demographics ==
=== Population ===
At the time of the 2006 National Census, the village's population was 287 in 76 households, when it was in Shirvan Rural District (Note: Renamed Shirvan-e Sharqi Rural District) of the Central District. The following census in 2011 counted 316 people in 90 households. The 2016 census measured the population of the village as 237 people in 79 households.

In 2021, the rural district was separated from the district in the formation of Shirvan District and renamed Shirvan-e Sharqi Rural District.
