= Valian, Lorestan =

Village in Lorestan province, Iran

Valian Persian: وليان
- Village
- Location within Iran
- Coordinates: 33°43′15″N 48°53′05″E
- Country: Iran
- Province: Lorestan
- County: Borujerd
- District: Shirvan
- Rural District: Shirvan-e Sharqi

Population (2016)
  - Total: 301
- Time zone: UTC+3:30 (IRST)

Valian (Persian: وليان) (Note: Also romanized as Valīān, Valyān, Velyān, and Wāliān) is a village in Shirvan-e Sharqi Rural District (Note: Formerly Shirvan Rural District) of Shirvan District in Borujerd County, Lorestan province, Iran.

== Demographics ==
=== Population ===
At the time of the 2006 National Census, the village's population was 337 in 84 households, when it was in Shirvan Rural District (Note: Renamed Shirvan-e Sharqi Rural District) of the Central District. The following census in 2011 counted 352 people in 105 households. The 2016 census measured the population of the village as 301 people in 91 households.

In 2021, the rural district was separated from the district in the formation of Shirvan District and renamed Shirvan-e Sharqi Rural District.
