= Sheykh Miri-ye Kalhor =

Sheykh Miri-ye Kalhor شيخ ميري كلهر
- Village
- Location within Iran
- Coordinates: 33°55′40″N 48°40′42″E
- Country: Iran
- Province: Lorestan
- County: Borujerd
- Bakhsh: Central
- Rural District: Hemmatabad

Population (2006)
  - Total: 215
- Time zone: UTC+3:30 (IRST)
  - Summer (DST): UTC+4:30 (IRDT)

Sheykh Miri-ye Kalhor (Persian: شيخ ميري كلهر, also Romanized as Sheykh Mīrī-ye Kalhor and Shaikh Mīri Kalhur) is a village in Hemmatabad Rural District, in the Central District of Borujerd County, Lorestan Province, Iran. At the 2006 census, its population was 215, in 59 families.
