= Tanjur, Iran =

Village in Lorestan province, Iran

Tanjur Persian: طنجور
- Village
- Location within Iran
- Coordinates: 33°49′02″N 48°47′44″E
- Country: Iran
- Province: Lorestan
- County: Borujerd
- District: Shirvan
- Rural District: Shirvan-e Sharqi

Population (2016)
  - Total: 1,914
- Time zone: UTC+3:30 (IRST)

Tanjur (Persian: طنجور) (Note: Also romanized as Ţanjūr; also known as Tanūr Dar) is a village in Shirvan-e Sharqi Rural District (Note: Formerly Shirvan Rural District) of Shirvan District in Borujerd County, Lorestan province, Iran.

== Demographics ==
=== Population ===
At the time of the 2006 National Census, the village's population was 1,156 in 283 households, when it was in Shirvan Rural District (Note: Renamed Shirvan-e Sharqi Rural District) of the Central District. The following census in 2011 counted 1,631 people in 460 households. The 2016 census measured the population of the village as 1,914 people in 565 households.

In 2021, the rural district was separated from the district in the formation of Shirvan District and renamed Shirvan-e Sharqi Rural District.
