= Darreh Morad =

Darreh Morad دره مراد
- Village
- Location within Iran
- Coordinates: 33°59′18″N 49°00′15″E
- Country: Iran
- Province: Lorestan
- County: Borujerd
- Bakhsh: Central
- Rural District: Darreh Seydi

Population (2006)
  - Total: 143
- Time zone: UTC+3:30 (IRST)
  - Summer (DST): UTC+4:30 (IRDT)

Darreh Morad (Persian: دره مراد, also Romanized as Darreh Morād and Darreh-ye Morād) is a village in Darreh Seydi Rural District, in the Central District of Borujerd County, Lorestan Province, Iran. At the 2006 census, its population was 143, in 31 families.
