= Cham Seyyedi =

Cham Seyyedi (Persian: چم صیدی) may refer to:

- Cham Seyyedi-ye Olya
- Cham Seyyedi-ye Sofla
- Cham Seyyedi-ye Vosta
