= Gusheh-ye Mohsen Ebn-e Ali =

Village in Lorestan province, Iran

Gusheh-ye Mohsen Ebn-e Ali Persian: گوشه محسن ابن علي
- Village
- Location within Iran
- Coordinates: 33°44′27″N 48°56′02″E
- Country: Iran
- Province: Lorestan
- County: Borujerd
- District: Shirvan
- Rural District: Shirvan-e Sharqi

Population (2016)
  - Total: 992
- Time zone: UTC+3:30 (IRST)

Gusheh-ye Mohsen Ebn-e Ali (Persian: گوشه محسن ابن علي) (Note: Also romanized as Gūsheh-e Moḩsen Ebn-e ‘Alī and Gūsheh-ye Moḩsen Ebn-e ‘Alī; also known as Gūsheh-ye Moḩsen and Gūsheh-ye Moḩsenebn) is a village in Shirvan-e Sharqi Rural District (Note: Formerly Shirvan Rural District) of Shirvan District in Borujerd County, Lorestan province, Iran.

== Demographics ==
=== Population ===
At the time of the 2006 National Census, the village's population was 1,076 in 267 households, when it was in Shirvan Rural District (Note: Renamed Shirvan-e Sharqi Rural District) of the Central District. The following census in 2011 counted 1,193 people in 312 households. The 2016 census measured the population of the village as 992 people in 312 households.

In 2021, the rural district was separated from the district in the formation of Shirvan District and renamed Shirvan-e Sharqi Rural District.
