= Badeh, Borujerd =

Village in Lorestan province, Iran

Badeh Persian: باده
- Village
- Location within Iran
- Coordinates: 33°50′11″N 48°47′03″E
- Country: Iran
- Province: Lorestan
- County: Borujerd
- District: Shirvan
- Rural District: Shirvan-e Sharqi

Population (2016)
  - Total: 464
- Time zone: UTC+3:30 (IRST)

Badeh (Persian: باده) (Note: Also romanized as Bādeh; also known as Bāda) is a village in Shirvan-e Sharqi Rural District (Note: Formerly Shirvan Rural District) of Shirvan District in Borujerd County, Lorestan province, Iran.

== Demographics ==
=== Population ===
At the time of the 2006 National Census, the village's population was 375 in 88 households, when it was in Hemmatabad Rural District of the Central District. The following census in 2011 counted 492 people in 135 households. The 2016 census measured the population of the village as 464 people in 140 households.

In 2021, the village was transferred to Shirvan-e Sharqi Rural District in the newly formed Shirvan District.
