= Kapargah =

Kapargah كپرگاه
- Village
- Location within Iran
- Coordinates: 33°54′23″N 48°39′21″E
- Country: Iran
- Province: Lorestan
- County: Borujerd
- Bakhsh: Central
- Rural District: Hemmatabad

Population (2006)
  - Total: 252
- Time zone: UTC+3:30 (IRST)
  - Summer (DST): UTC+4:30 (IRDT)

Kapargah (Persian: كپرگاه, also Romanized as Kapargāh, Gapargah, Kafargāh, Khafargāh, and Khafr Gāh) is a village in Hemmatabad Rural District, in the Central District of Borujerd County, Lorestan Province, Iran. At the 2006 census, its population was 252, in 61 families.
