= Taheriabad =

Village in Lorestan province, Iran

Taheriabad Persian: طاهري آباد
- Village
- Location within Iran
- Coordinates: 33°45′10″N 48°45′54″E
- Country: Iran
- Province: Lorestan
- County: Borujerd
- District: Shirvan
- Rural District: Shirvan-e Sharqi

Population (2016)
  - Total: 109
- Time zone: UTC+3:30 (IRST)

Taheriabad (Persian: طاهري آباد) (Note: Also romanized as Ţāherīābād) is a village in Shirvan-e Sharqi Rural District (Note: Formerly Shirvan Rural District) of Shirvan District in Borujerd County, Lorestan province, Iran.

== Demographics ==
=== Population ===
At the time of the 2006 National Census, the village's population was 224 in 47 households, when it was in Shirvan Rural District (Note: Renamed Shirvan-e Sharqi Rural District) of the Central District. The following census in 2011 counted 141 people in 39 households. The 2016 census measured the population of the village as 109 people in 28 households.

In 2021, the rural district was separated from the district in the formation of Shirvan District and renamed Shirvan-e Sharqi Rural District.
