= Hemmatabad, Borujerd =

Village in Lorestan province, Iran

Hemmatabad Persian: همت اباد
- Village
- Location within Iran
- Coordinates: 33°50′19″N 48°47′37″E
- Country: Iran
- Province: Lorestan
- County: Borujerd
- District: Shirvan
- Rural District: Shirvan-e Sharqi

Population (2016)
  - Total: 1,012
- Time zone: UTC+3:30 (IRST)

Hemmatabad (Persian: همت اباد) (Note: Also romanized as Hemmatābād) is a village in Shirvan-e Sharqi Rural District (Note: Formerly Shirvan Rural District) of Shirvan District in Borujerd County, Lorestan province, Iran. It was the capital of Hemmatabad Rural District in the Central District until its capital was transferred to the village of Meynal.

== Demographics ==
=== Population ===
At the time of the 2006 National Census, the village's population was 692 in 177 households, when it was in Hemmatabad Rural District of the Central District. The following census in 2011 counted 2,423 people in 660 households. The 2016 census measured the population of the village as 1,012 people in 305 households.

In 2021, the village was transferred to Shirvan-e Sharqi Rural District in the newly formed Shirvan District.
