= Sar Tappeh =

Sar Tappeh or Sartappeh or Sartapah (Persian: سرتپه) may refer to:

- Sar Tappeh, East Azerbaijan
- Sar Tappeh, Golestan
- Sartapah, Kermanshah
- Sar Tappeh-ye Olya, Lorestan Province
- Sar Tappeh-ye Sofla, Lorestan Province
