= Tang-e Loreh =

Tang-e Loreh تنگ لره
- Village
- Location within Iran
- Coordinates: 33°48′00″N 48°37′00″E
- Country: Iran
- Province: Lorestan
- County: Borujerd
- Bakhsh: Central
- Rural District: Hemmatabad

Population (2006)
  - Total: 145
- Time zone: UTC+3:30 (IRST)
  - Summer (DST): UTC+4:30 (IRDT)

Tang-e Loreh (Persian: تنگ لره) is a village in Hemmatabad Rural District, in the Central District of Borujerd County, Lorestan Province, Iran. At the 2006 census, its population was 145, in 32 families.
