= Vajihabad, Lorestan =

Village in Lorestan province, Iran

Vajihabad Persian: وجيه اباد
- Village
- Location within Iran
- Coordinates: 33°41′46″N 48°48′13″E
- Country: Iran
- Province: Lorestan
- County: Borujerd
- District: Shirvan
- Rural District: Shirvan-e Gharbi

Population (2016)
  - Total: 56
- Time zone: UTC+3:30 (IRST)

Vajihabad (Persian: وجيه اباد) (Note: Also romanized as Vajīhābād; also known as Darreh Rasūl and Darreh Sūl) is a village in Shirvan-e Gharbi Rural District of Shirvan District in Borujerd County, Lorestan province, Iran.

== Demographics ==
=== Population ===
At the time of the 2006 National Census, the village's population was 61 in 13 households, when it was in Shirvan Rural District (Note: Renamed Shirvan-e Sharqi Rural District) of the Central District. The following census in 2011 counted 43 people in 11 households. The 2016 census measured the population of the village as 56 people in 13 households.

In 2021, the rural district was separated from the district in the formation of Shirvan District and renamed Shirvan-e Sharqi Rural District. Vajihabad was transferred to Shirvan-e Gharbi Rural District created in the new district.
