= Sarab-e Zarem =

Village in Lorestan province, Iran

Sarab-e Zarem Persian: سراب زارم
- Village
- Location within Iran
- Coordinates: 33°48′53″N 48°48′25″E
- Country: Iran
- Province: Lorestan
- County: Borujerd
- District: Shirvan
- Rural District: Shirvan-e Sharqi

Population (2016)
  - Total: 698
- Time zone: UTC+3:30 (IRST)

Sarab-e Zarem (Persian: سراب زارم) (Note: Also romanized as Sarāb-e Zārem) is a village in Shirvan-e Sharqi Rural District (Note: Formerly Shirvan Rural District) of Shirvan District in Borujerd County, Lorestan province, Iran.

== Demographics ==
=== Population ===
At the time of the 2006 National Census, the village's population was 471 in 131 households, when it was in Shirvan Rural District (Note: Renamed Shirvan-e Sharqi Rural District) of the Central District. The following census in 2011 counted 802 people in 205 households. The 2016 census measured the population of the village as 698 people in 209 households.

In 2021, the rural district was separated from the district in the formation of Shirvan District and renamed Shirvan-e Sharqi Rural District.
