= Qaleh-ye Shamsi =

Qaleh-ye Shamsi قلعه شمسي
- Village
- Location within Iran
- Coordinates: 33°54′49″N 48°43′15″E
- Country: Iran
- Province: Lorestan
- County: Borujerd
- Bakhsh: Central
- Rural District: Hemmatabad

Population (2006)
  - Total: 429
- Time zone: UTC+3:30 (IRST)
  - Summer (DST): UTC+4:30 (IRDT)

Qaleh-ye Shamsi (Persian: قلعه شمسي, also Romanized as Qal‘eh-ye Shamsī, Qal‘eh Shamshāh, Qal‘eh-ye Shamsā, and Qal‘eh-ye Shamshāh) is a village in Hemmatabad Rural District, in the Central District of Borujerd County, Lorestan Province, Iran. At the 2006 census, its population was 429, in 109 families.
