= Sar Tappeh-ye Bala =

Village in Lorestan province, Iran

Sar Tappeh-ye Bala Persian: سرتپه بالا
- Village
- Location within Iran
- Country: Iran
- Province: Lorestan
- County: Borujerd
- District: Shirvan
- Rural District: Shirvan-e Gharbi

Population (2016)
  - Total: Below reporting threshold
- Time zone: UTC+3:30 (IRST)

Sar Tappeh-ye Bala (Persian: سرتپه بالا) (Note: Also romanized as Sar Tappeh-ye Bālā; formerly known as Sar Tappeh (سرتپه); also known as Sar Tappeh-ye ‘Olyā, Seh Tepe, and Sih Tepe) is a village in Shirvan-e Gharbi Rural District of Shirvan District in Borujerd County, Lorestan province, Iran.

== Demographics ==
=== Population ===
At the time of the 2006 National Census, the village's population, as Sar Tappeh, was 158 in 34 households, when it was in Shirvan Rural District (Note: Renamed Shirvan-e Sharqi Rural District) of the Central District. The following censuses in 2011 and 2016 counted a population below the reporting threshold, by which time the village was listed as Sar Tappeh-ye Bala.

In 2021, the rural district was separated from the district in the formation of Shirvan District and renamed Shirvan-e Sharqi Rural District. Sar Tappeh-ye Bala was transferred to Shirvan-e Gharbi Rural District created in the new district.
