= Rah Band-e Sofla =

Rah Band-e Sofla راه بندسفلي
- Village
- Location within Iran
- Coordinates: 33°46′00″N 48°38′00″E
- Country: Iran
- Province: Lorestan
- County: Borujerd
- Bakhsh: Central
- Rural District: Hemmatabad

Population (2006)
  - Total: 88
- Time zone: UTC+3:30 (IRST)
  - Summer (DST): UTC+4:30 (IRDT)

Rah Band-e Sofla (Persian: راه بندسفلي, also Romanized as Rāh Band-e Soflá and Rāband-e Soflá) is a village in Hemmatabad Rural District, in the Central District of Borujerd County, Lorestan Province, Iran. At the 2006 census, its population was 88, in 22 families.
