= Deh Tushmal =

Deh Tushmal ده توشمال
- Village
- Location within Iran
- Coordinates: 33°59′15″N 48°59′11″E
- Country: Iran
- Province: Lorestan
- County: Borujerd
- Bakhsh: Central
- Rural District: Darreh Seydi

Population (2006)
  - Total: 93
- Time zone: UTC+3:30 (IRST)
  - Summer (DST): UTC+4:30 (IRDT)

Deh Tushmal (Persian: ده توشمال, also Romanized as Deh Tūshmāl) is a village in Darreh Seydi Rural District, in the Central District of Borujerd County, Lorestan Province, Iran. At the 2006 census, its population was 93, in 22 families.
