= Ab Sardeh-ye Alai =

Ab Sardeh-ye Alai ابسرده الائي
- Village
- Location within Iran
- Coordinates: 33°46′00″N 48°38′00″E
- Country: Iran
- Province: Lorestan
- County: Borujerd
- Bakhsh: Central
- Rural District: Hemmatabad

Population (2006)
  - Total: 133
- Time zone: UTC+3:30 (IRST)
  - Summer (DST): UTC+4:30 (IRDT)

Ab Sardeh-ye Alai (Persian: ابسرده الائي, also Romanized as Āb Sardeh-ye Ālā’ī) is a village in Hemmatabad Rural District, in the Central District of Borujerd County, Lorestan province, Iran. At the 2006 census, its population was 133, in 30 families.
