= Pa Pulak =

Village in Lorestan province, Iran

Pa Pulak Persian: پاپولك
- Village
- Location within Iran
- Coordinates: 33°45′11″N 48°45′41″E
- Country: Iran
- Province: Lorestan
- County: Borujerd
- District: Shirvan
- Rural District: Shirvan-e Gharbi

Population (2016)
  - Total: 315
- Time zone: UTC+3:30 (IRST)

Pa Pulak (Persian: پاپولك) (Note: Also romanized as Pā Pūlak; also known as Pāy Pūlak and Phafulak) is a village in Shirvan-e Gharbi Rural District of Shirvan District in Borujerd County, Lorestan province, Iran.

== Demographics ==
=== Population ===
At the time of the 2006 National Census, the village's population was 339 in 79 households, when it was in Shirvan Rural District (Note: Renamed Shirvan-e Sharqi Rural District) of the Central District. The following census in 2011 counted 344 people in 95 households. The 2016 census measured the population of the village as 315 people in 95 households.

In 2021, the rural district was separated from the district in the formation of Shirvan District and renamed Shirvan-e Sharqi Rural District. Pa Pulak was transferred to Shirvan-e Gharbi Rural District created in the new district.
