= Darreh Chapi =

Darreh Chapi (Persian: دره چپي) may refer to:

- Darreh Chapi, Ilam, Iran
- Darreh Chapi, Kohgiluyeh and Boyer-Ahmad, Iran
- Darreh Chapi, Lorestan, Iran
