= Bardbol, Shirvan =

Village in Lorestan province, Iran

Bardbol Persian: بردبل
- Village
- Location within Iran
- Coordinates: 33°50′37″N 48°56′07″E
- Country: Iran
- Province: Lorestan
- County: Borujerd
- District: Shirvan
- Rural District: Shirvan-e Gharbi

Population (2016)
  - Total: 28
- Time zone: UTC+3:30 (IRST)

Bardbol (Persian: بردبل) (Note: Also known as Bar Dūl, Bārd-e Bal, Bardvāl, and Bardwāl) is a village in Shirvan-e Gharbi Rural District of Shirvan District in Borujerd County, Lorestan province, Iran.

== Demographics ==
=== Population ===
At the time of the 2006 National Census, the village's population was 29 in seven households, when it was in Shirvan Rural District (Note: Renamed Shirvan-e Sharqi Rural District) of the Central District. The following census in 2011 counted 31 people in eight households. The 2016 census measured the population of the village as 28 people in seven households.

In 2021, the rural district was separated from the district in the formation of Shirvan District and renamed Shirvan-e Sharqi Rural District. Bardbol was transferred to Shirvan-e Gharbi Rural District created in the new district.
