= Kapar Judaki =

Village in Lorestan province, Iran

Kapar Judaki Persian: كپرجودكي
- Village
- Location within Iran
- Coordinates: 33°47′42″N 48°45′49″E
- Country: Iran
- Province: Lorestan
- County: Borujerd
- District: Shirvan
- Rural District: Shirvan-e Sharqi

Population (2016)
  - Total: 344
- Time zone: UTC+3:30 (IRST)

Kapar Judaki (Persian: كپرجودكي) (Note: Also romanized as Kapar Jūdakī; also known as Kapar and Khāpār) is a village in Shirvan-e Sharqi Rural District (Note: Formerly Shirvan Rural District) of Shirvan District in Borujerd County, Lorestan province, Iran.

== Demographics ==
=== Population ===
At the time of the 2006 National Census, the village's population was 355 in 89 households, when it was in Shirvan Rural District (Note: Renamed Shirvan-e Sharqi Rural District) of the Central District. The following census in 2011 counted 392 people in 106 households. The 2016 census measured the population of the village as 344 people in 100 households.

In 2021, the rural district was separated from the district in the formation of Shirvan District and renamed Shirvan-e Sharqi Rural District.
