= Qaleh-ye Samur Khan =

Qaleh-ye Samur Khan قلعه ثمورخان
- Village
- Location within Iran
- Coordinates: 33°52′48″N 48°58′12″E
- Country: Iran
- Province: Lorestan
- County: Borujerd
- Bakhsh: Central
- Rural District: Valanjerd

Population (2006)
  - Total: 185
- Time zone: UTC+3:30 (IRST)
  - Summer (DST): UTC+4:30 (IRDT)

Qaleh-ye Samur Khan (Persian: قلعه ثمورخان, also Romanized as Qalʿeh-ye Samūr Khān) is a village in Valanjerd Rural District, in the Central District of Borujerd County, Lorestan Province, Iran. At the 2006 census, its population was 185, in 46 families.
