= Aileh =

Aileh ائيله
- Village
- Location within Iran
- Coordinates: 33°51′00″N 48°45′00″E
- Country: Iran
- Province: Lorestan
- County: Borujerd
- Bakhsh: Central
- Rural District: Hemmatabad

Population (2006)
  - Total: 104
- Time zone: UTC+3:30 (IRST)
  - Summer (DST): UTC+4:30 (IRDT)

Aileh (Persian: ائيله, also Romanized as Ā’īleh) is a village in Hemmatabad Rural District, in the Central District of Borujerd County, Lorestan Province, Iran. At the 2006 census, its population was 104, in 20 families.
