= Chapdar =

Chapdar چپدر
- village
- Location within Iran
- Coordinates: 33°58′29″N 48°51′16″E
- Country: Iran
- Province: Lorestan
- County: Borujerd
- Bakhsh: Central
- Rural District: Darreh Seydi

Population (2006)
  - Total: 72
- Time zone: UTC+3:30 (IRST)
  - Summer (DST): UTC+4:30 (IRDT)

Chapdar (Persian: چپدر, also Romanized as Chabdar; also known as Choghābdār and Choqāb Dār) is a village in Darreh Seydi Rural District, in the Central District of Borujerd County, Lorestan Province, Iran. At the 2006 census, its population was 72, in 15 families.
