= Keydan =

Village in Lorestan province, Iran

Keydan Persian: كيدان
- Village
- Location within Iran
- Coordinates: 33°48′05″N 48°46′17″E
- Country: Iran
- Province: Lorestan
- County: Borujerd
- District: Shirvan
- Rural District: Shirvan-e Sharqi

Population (2016)
  - Total: 845
- Time zone: UTC+3:30 (IRST)

Keydan (Persian: كيدان) (Note: Also romanized as Keydān; also known as Khaidūn (چغاکري) and Kheydūn) is a village in Shirvan-e Sharqi Rural District (Note: Formerly Shirvan Rural District) of Shirvan District in Borujerd County, Lorestan province, Iran.

== Demographics ==
=== Population ===
At the time of the 2006 National Census, the village's population was 909 in 210 households, when it was in Shirvan Rural District (Note: Renamed Shirvan-e Sharqi Rural District) of the Central District. The following census in 2011 counted 981 people in 278 households. The 2016 census measured the population of the village as 845 people in 240 households.

In 2021, the rural district was separated from the district in the formation of Shirvan District and renamed Shirvan-e Sharqi Rural District.
