= Karvaneh, Lorestan =

Village in Lorestan province, Iran

Karvaneh Persian: كاروانه
- Village
- Location within Iran
- Coordinates: 33°48′35″N 48°45′26″E
- Country: Iran
- Province: Lorestan
- County: Borujerd
- District: Shirvan
- Rural District: Shirvan-e Sharqi

Population (2016)
  - Total: 422
- Time zone: UTC+3:30 (IRST)

Karvaneh (Persian: كاروانه) (Note: Also romanized as Kārvāneh; also known as Karwāna) is a village in Shirvan-e Sharqi Rural District (Note: Formerly Shirvan Rural District) of Shirvan District in Borujerd County, Lorestan province, Iran.

== Demographics ==
=== Population ===
At the time of the 2006 National Census, the village's population was 419 in 94 households, when it was in Shirvan Rural District (Note: Renamed Shirvan-e Sharqi Rural District) of the Central District. The following census in 2011 counted 316 people in 85 households. The 2016 census measured the population of the village as 422 people in 121 households.

In 2021, the rural district was separated from the district in the formation of Shirvan District and renamed Shirvan-e Sharqi Rural District.
