= Darreh Naqdi =

Darreh Naqdi دره نقدي
- Village
- Location within Iran
- Coordinates: 33°54′41″N 48°56′19″E
- Country: Iran
- Province: Lorestan
- County: Borujerd
- Bakhsh: Central
- Rural District: Darreh Seydi

Population (2006)
  - Total: 121
- Time zone: UTC+3:30 (IRST)
  - Summer (DST): UTC+4:30 (IRDT)

Darreh Naqdi (Persian: دره نقدي, also Romanized as Darreh Naqdī, Darreh Naqd, and Darreh-ye Naqdī) is a village in Darreh Seydi Rural District, in the Central District of Borujerd County, Lorestan Province, Iran. At the 2006 census, its population was 121, in 25 families.
