= Cheshmeh Kabud, Borujerd =

Village in Lorestan province, Iran

Cheshmeh Kabud Persian: چشمه کبود
- Village
- Location within Iran
- Country: Iran
- Province: Lorestan
- County: Borujerd
- District: Shirvan
- Rural District: Shirvan-e Sharqi

Population (2016)
  - Total: 31
- Time zone: UTC+3:30 (IRST)

Cheshmeh Kabud (Persian: چشمه کبود) (Note: Also romanized as Cheshmeh Kabūd) is a village in Shirvan-e Sharqi Rural District (Note: Formerly Shirvan Rural District) of Shirvan District in Borujerd County, Lorestan province, Iran.

== Demographics ==
=== Population ===
At the time of the 2006 National Census, the village's population was 39 in eight households, when it was in Shirvan Rural District (Note: Renamed Shirvan-e Sharqi Rural District) of the Central District. The following census in 2011 counted 49 people in 12 households. The 2016 census measured the population of the village as 31 people in seven households.

In 2021, the rural district was separated from the district in the formation of Shirvan District and renamed Shirvan-e Sharqi Rural District.
