= Hezar Jerib =

Hezar Jerib or Hezar Jarib or Hazar Jarib or Hazar Jerib (Persian: هزارجريب) may refer to several places in Iran:

- Hezar Jerib, Chaharmahal and Bakhtiari
- Hezar Jerib, Hamadan
- Hezar Jarib, Isfahan
- Hezar Jerib, Lorestan
- Hezarjarib District, Mazandaran Province
