= Deliabad =

Village in Lorestan province, Iran

Deliabad Persian: دلي اباد
- Village
- Location within Iran
- Country: Iran
- Province: Lorestan
- County: Borujerd
- District: Shirvan
- Rural District: Shirvan-e Sharqi

Population (2016)
  - Total: 585
- Time zone: UTC+3:30 (IRST)

Deliabad (Persian: دلي اباد) (Note: Also romanized as Dalīābād and Delīābād; also known as Dalābād) is a village in Shirvan-e Sharqi Rural District (Note: Formerly Shirvan Rural District) of Shirvan District in Borujerd County, Lorestan province, Iran.

== Demographics ==
=== Population ===
At the time of the 2006 National Census, the village's population was 509 in 126 households, when it was in Shirvan Rural District (Note: Renamed Shirvan-e Sharqi Rural District) of the Central District. The following census in 2011 counted 545 people in 160 households. The 2016 census measured the population of the village as 585 people in 182 households.

In 2021, the rural district was separated from the district in the formation of Shirvan District and renamed Shirvan-e Sharqi Rural District.
