= Darreh Zagheh-ye Bala =

Darreh Zagheh-ye Bala دره زاغه بالا
- Village
- Location within Iran
- Coordinates: 33°54′05″N 48°53′12″E
- Country: Iran
- Province: Lorestan
- County: Borujerd
- Bakhsh: Central
- Rural District: Valanjerd

Population (2006)
  - Total: 219
- Time zone: UTC+3:30 (IRST)
  - Summer (DST): UTC+4:30 (IRDT)

Darreh Zagheh-ye Bala (Persian: دره زاغه بالا, also Romanized as Darreh Zāgheh-ye Bālā and Darreh Zāgheh Bālā; also known as Darreh Zāgheh-ye 'Olyā) is a village in Valanjerd Rural District, in the Central District of Borujerd County, Lorestan province, Iran. At the 2006 census, its population was 219, in 51 families.
