= Shirvan, Lorestan =

Village in Lorestan province, Iran

Shirvan Persian: شيروان
- Village
- Location within Iran
- Coordinates: 33°46′22″N 48°47′47″E
- Country: Iran
- Province: Lorestan
- County: Borujerd
- District: Shirvan
- Rural District: Shirvan-e Gharbi

Population (2016)
  - Total: 1,051
- Time zone: UTC+3:30 (IRST)

Shirvan (Persian: شيروان) (Note: Also romanized as Shīrvān; also known as Shahrak-e Shirvan (شهرك شيروان), also romanized as Shahraḵ-e Shīrvān; also known as Sharkat Zarayi Shirvan Chafa (شركت زراعي شيروان چفا), also romanized as Sharḵat Zarāʿī Shīrvān Chafā; and also known as Ḩasanābād, Raḩīmābād, and Shīrvān Chaqā) is a village in Shirvan-e Gharbi Rural District of Shirvan District in Borujerd County, Lorestan province, Iran, serving as capital of the district. It was the capital of Shirvan Rural District (Note: Renamed Shirvan-e Sharqi Rural District) until its capital was transferred to the village of Khayan.

== Demographics ==
=== Population ===
At the time of the 2006 National Census, the village's population was 1,101 in 280 households, when it was Sharkat Zarayi Shirvan Chafa in Shirvan Rural District of the Central District. The following census in 2011 counted 1,139 people in 331 households. The 2016 census measured the population of the village as 1,051 people in 326 households.

In 2021, the rural district was separated from the district in the formation of Shirvan District and renamed Shirvan-e Sharqi Rural District. Sharkat Zarayi Shirvan Chafa was transferred to Shirvan-e Gharbi Rural District created in the new district and renamed Shirvan.
