= Boz Hal =

Boz Hal بزهل
- Village
- Location within Iran
- Coordinates: 33°45′50″N 48°42′34″E
- Country: Iran
- Province: Lorestan
- County: Borujerd
- Bakhsh: Central
- Rural District: Hemmatabad

Population (2006)
  - Total: 38
- Time zone: UTC+3:30 (IRST)
  - Summer (DST): UTC+4:30 (IRDT)

Boz Hal (Persian: بزهل, also Romanized as Bozhol) is a village in Hemmatabad Rural District, in the Central District of Borujerd County, Lorestan Province, Iran. At the 2006 census, its population was 38, in 11 families.
