= Kabutaran =

Kabutaran (Persian: كبوتران) may refer to:

- Kabutaran, Khuzestan
- Kabutaran, Kohgiluyeh and Boyer-Ahmad
- Kabutaran, Lorestan
