= Rahimabad, Borujerd =

Village in Lorestan province, Iran

Rahimabad Persian: رحيم اباد
- Village
- Location within Iran
- Coordinates: 33°46′51″N 48°47′52″E
- Country: Iran
- Province: Lorestan
- County: Borujerd
- District: Shirvan
- Rural District: Shirvan-e Sharqi

Population (2016)
  - Total: 304
- Time zone: UTC+3:30 (IRST)

Rahimabad (Persian: رحيم اباد) (Note: Also romanized as Raḩīmābād; also known as Rāmābād) is a village in Shirvan-e Sharqi Rural District (Note: Formerly Shirvan Rural District) of Shirvan District in Borujerd County, Lorestan province, Iran.

== Demographics ==
=== Population ===
At the time of the 2006 National Census, the village's population was 285 in 68 households, when it was in Shirvan Rural District (Note: Renamed Shirvan-e Sharqi Rural District) of the Central District. The following census in 2011 counted 283 people in 77 households. The 2016 census measured the population of the village as 304 people in 93 households.

In 2021, the rural district was separated from the district in the formation of Shirvan District and renamed Shirvan-e Sharqi Rural District.
