= Qarah Su, Lorestan =

Village in Lorestan province, Iran

Qarah Su Persian: قره سو
- Village
- Location within Iran
- Coordinates: 33°46′23″N 48°50′04″E
- Country: Iran
- Province: Lorestan
- County: Borujerd
- District: Shirvan
- Rural District: Shirvan-e Sharqi

Population (2016)
  - Total: 554
- Time zone: UTC+3:30 (IRST)

Qarah Su (Persian: قره سو) (Note: Also romanized as Qarah Sū and Qareh Sū; also known as Qara Su) is a village in Shirvan-e Sharqi Rural District (Note: Formerly Shirvan Rural District) of Shirvan District in Borujerd County, Lorestan province, Iran.

== Demographics ==
=== Population ===
At the time of the 2006 National Census, the village's population was 452 in 116 households, when it was in Shirvan Rural District (Note: Renamed Shirvan-e Sharqi Rural District) of the Central District. The following census in 2011 counted 529 people in 137 households. The 2016 census measured the population of the village as 554 people in 149 households.

In 2021, the rural district was separated from the district in the formation of Shirvan District and renamed Shirvan-e Sharqi Rural District.
