= Kabutari =

Kabutari (Persian: كبوتري) may refer to:

- Kabutari, Andimeshk, Khuzestan Province
- Kabutari, Ramhormoz, Khuzestan Province
- Kabutari, Kohgiluyeh and Boyer-Ahmad
