= Nel Khvast-e Bala =

Village in Lorestan province, Iran

Nel Khvast-e Bala Persian: نلخاص بالا
- Village
- Location within Iran
- Coordinates: 33°45′29″N 48°59′04″E
- Country: Iran
- Province: Lorestan
- County: Borujerd
- District: Shirvan
- Rural District: Shirvan-e Sharqi

Population (2016)
  - Total: 83
- Time zone: UTC+3:30 (IRST)

Nel Khvast-e Bala (Persian: نلخاص عليا) (Note: Also romanized as Nel Khvāṣt-e Bālā, formerly known as Nel Khvast-e Olya (نلخاص عليا), also romanized as Nel Khvāṣt-e ʿOlyā) is a village in Shirvan-e Sharqi Rural District (Note: Formerly Shirvan Rural District) of Shirvan District in Borujerd County, Lorestan province, Iran.

== Demographics ==
=== Population ===
At the time of the 2006 National Census, the village's population, as Nel Khvast-e Olya, was 145 in 32 households, when it was in Shirvan Rural District (Note: Renamed Shirvan-e Sharqi Rural District) of the Central District. The following census in 2011 counted 139 people in 37 households, by which time the village was listed as Nel Khvast-e Bala. The 2016 census measured the population of the village as 83 people in 29 households.

In 2021, the rural district was separated from the district in the formation of Shirvan District and renamed Shirvan-e Sharqi Rural District.
