= Sarab-e Panbeh =

Sarab-e Panbeh سرابپنبه
- Village
- Location within Iran
- Coordinates: 33°52′33″N 48°39′48″E
- Country: Iran
- Province: Lorestan
- County: Borujerd
- Bakhsh: Central
- Rural District: Hemmatabad

Population (2006)
  - Total: 35
- Time zone: UTC+3:30 (IRST)
  - Summer (DST): UTC+4:30 (IRDT)

Sarab-e Panbeh (Persian: سرابپنبه, also Romanized as Sarāb-e Panbeh) is a village in Hemmatabad Rural District, in the Central District of Borujerd County, Lorestan Province, Iran. At the 2006 census, its population was 35, in 8 families.
