= Janbolaq =

Janbolaq جنبلاق
- Village
- Location within Iran
- Coordinates: 33°59′31″N 48°50′08″E
- Country: Iran
- Province: Lorestan
- County: Borujerd
- Bakhsh: Central
- Rural District: Darreh Seydi

Population (2006)
  - Total: 81
- Time zone: UTC+3:30 (IRST)
  - Summer (DST): UTC+4:30 (IRDT)

Janbolaq (Persian: جنبلاق, also Romanized as Janbolāq, Chāh Bolāgh, Jāh Bolāgh, Jān Bolāgh, Jenbolāq, and Jinbulāgh) is a village and commercial hub in Darreh Seydi Rural District, in the Central District of Borujerd County, Lorestan Province, Iran. At the 2006 census, its population was 81, in 24 families.
