= Khayan =

Village in Lorestan province, Iran

Khayan Persian: خايان
- Village
- Location within Iran
- Coordinates: 33°46′25″N 48°53′53″E
- Country: Iran
- Province: Lorestan
- County: Borujerd
- District: Shirvan
- Rural District: Shirvan-e Sharqi

Population (2016)
  - Total: 2,148
- Time zone: UTC+3:30 (IRST)

Khayan (Persian: خايان) (Note: Also romanized as Khāyān; also known as Khāyūn) is a village in, and the capital of, Shirvan-e Sharqi Rural District (Note: Formerly Shirvan Rural District) in Shirvan District of Borujerd County, Lorestan province, Iran. The previous capital of the rural district was the village of Sharkat Zarayi Shirvan Chafa. (Note: Renamed Shirvan)

== Demographics ==
=== Population ===
At the time of the 2006 National Census, the village's population was 2,096 in 579 households, when it was in Shirvan Rural District (Note: Renamed Shirvan-e Sharqi Rural District) of the Central District. The following census in 2011 counted 2,174 people in 687 households. The 2016 census measured the population of the village as 2,148 people in 678 households, the most populous in its rural district.

In 2021, the rural district was separated from the district in the formation of Shirvan District and renamed Shirvan-e Sharqi Rural District.
