= Valashan =

Valashan ولاشان
- Village
- Location within Iran
- Coordinates: 33°49′26″N 48°45′26″E
- Country: Iran
- Province: Esfahan
- County: Esfahan
- Bakhsh: Central
- Rural District: Esfahan

Population (2006)
  - Total: 354
- Time zone: UTC+3:30 (IRST)
  - Summer (DST): UTC+4:30 (IRDT)

Valashan (Persian: ولاشان, also Romanized as Valashān) is a village in Esfahan in the Central District of Esfahan County, Esfahan Province, Iran. At the 2006 census, its population was 7000, in 500 families.
