= Tabarijan =

Village in Lorestan province, Iran

Tabarijan Persian: طبريجان
- Village
- Location within Iran
- Coordinates: 33°49′00″N 48°46′41″E
- Country: Iran
- Province: Lorestan
- County: Borujerd
- District: Shirvan
- Rural District: Shirvan-e Sharqi

Population (2016)
  - Total: 675
- Time zone: UTC+3:30 (IRST)

Tabarijan (Persian: طبريجان) (Note: Also romanized as Ţabarījān and Tabrijān) is a village in Shirvan-e Sharqi Rural District (Note: Formerly Shirvan Rural District) of Shirvan District in Borujerd County, Lorestan province, Iran.

== Demographics ==
=== Population ===
At the time of the 2006 National Census, the village's population was 503 in 123 households, when it was in Shirvan Rural District (Note: Renamed Shirvan-e Sharqi Rural District) of the Central District. The following census in 2011 counted 640 people in 168 households. The 2016 census measured the population of the village as 675 people in 190 households.

In 2021, the rural district was separated from the district in the formation of Shirvan District and renamed Shirvan-e Sharqi Rural District.
