= Qaleh Now-ye Showkati =

Village in Lorestan province, Iran

Qaleh Now-ye Showkati Persian: قلعه نوشوكتي
- Village
- Location within Iran
- Coordinates: 33°45′42″N 48°50′59″E
- Country: Iran
- Province: Lorestan
- County: Borujerd
- District: Shirvan
- Rural District: Shirvan-e Sharqi

Population (2016)
  - Total: 326
- Time zone: UTC+3:30 (IRST)

Qaleh Now-ye Showkati (Persian: قلعه نوشوكتي) (Note: Also romanized as Qal‘eh Now-ye Showkatī and Qal‘eh-ye Now-e Showkatī; also known as Qal‘eh Nau, Qal‘eh Now, and Qal‘eh-ye Now) is a village in Shirvan-e Sharqi Rural District (Note: Formerly Shirvan Rural District) of Shirvan District in Borujerd County, Lorestan province, Iran.

== Demographics ==
=== Population ===
At the time of the 2006 National Census, the village's population was 350 in 87 households, when it was in Shirvan Rural District (Note: Renamed Shirvan-e Sharqi Rural District) of the Central District. The following census in 2011 counted 349 people in 96 households. The 2016 census measured the population of the village as 326 people in 91 households.

In 2021, the rural district was separated from the district in the formation of Shirvan District and renamed Shirvan-e Sharqi Rural District.
