= Bardbol =

Bardbol (Persian: بردبل) may refer to thec following places in Lorestan Province, Iran:

- Bardbol, Shirvan, Central District of Borujerd County
- Bardbol, Valanjerd, Central District of Borujerd County
- Bardbol, Selseleh, Selseleh County
