= Jahanabad, Borujerd =

Neighborhood in Lorestan province, Iran

Jahanabad Persian: جهان اباد
- Neighborhood
- Location within Iran
- Country: Iran
- Province: Lorestan
- County: Borujerd
- District: Central
- City: Borujerd

Population (2016)
  - Total: 4,581
- Time zone: UTC+3:30 (IRST)

Jahanabad (Persian: جهان اباد) (Note: Also romanized as Jahānābād) is a neighborhood in the city of Borujerd in the Central District of Borujerd County, Lorestan province, Iran.

== Demographics ==
=== Population ===
At the time of the 2006 National Census, Jahanabad's population was 4,115 in 979 households, when it was a village in Hemmatabad Rural District. The following census in 2011 counted 3,837 people in 1,046 households. The 2016 census measured the population of the village as 4,581 people in 1,337 households, the most populous in its rural district.

Jahanabad was annexed by the city of Borujerd in 2023.
