= Shah Viran-e Bala =

Shah Viran-e Bala شاه ويران بالا
- Village
- Location within Iran
- Coordinates: 33°50′57″N 48°44′18″E
- Country: Iran
- Province: Lorestan
- County: Borujerd
- Bakhsh: Central
- Rural District: Hemmatabad

Population (2006)
  - Total: 83
- Time zone: UTC+3:30 (IRST)
  - Summer (DST): UTC+4:30 (IRDT)

Shah Viran-e Bala (Persian: شاه ويران بالا, also Romanized as Shāh Vīrān-e Bālā; also known as Shāh Vīrān-e ‘Olyā) is a village in Hemmatabad Rural District, in the Central District of Borujerd County, Lorestan Province, Iran. At the 2006 census, its population was 83, in 18 families.
