= Darreh Bidad-e Bala =

Village in Lorestan province, Iran

Darreh Bidad-e Bala Persian: دره بيداد بالا
- Village
- Location within Iran
- Coordinates: 33°42′03″N 48°41′39″E
- Country: Iran
- Province: Lorestan
- County: Borujerd
- District: Shirvan
- Rural District: Shirvan-e Sharqi

Population (2016)
  - Total: 55
- Time zone: UTC+3:30 (IRST)

Darreh Bidad-e Bala (Persian: دره بيدادعليا) (Note: Also romanized as Darreh Bīdād-e Bālā; formerly known as Darreh Bidad-e Olya (دره بيدادعليا), also romanized as Darreh-ye Bīdād-e 'Olyā; also known as Darreh Bīdād) is a village in Shirvan-e Sharqi Rural District (Note: Formerly Shirvan Rural District) of Shirvan District in Borujerd County, Lorestan province, Iran.

== Demographics ==
=== Population ===
At the time of the 2006 National Census, the village's population, as Darreh Bidad-e Sofla, was 57 in 11 households, when it was in Shirvan Rural District (Note: Renamed Shirvan-e Sharqi Rural District) of the Central District. The following census in 2011 counted 63 people in 14 households, by which time the village was listed as Darreh Bidad-e Bala. The 2016 census measured the population of the village as 55 people in 15 households.

In 2021, the rural district was separated from the district in the formation of Shirvan District and renamed Shirvan-e Sharqi Rural District.
