= Dodangeh, Lorestan =

Village in Lorestan province, Iran

Dodangeh Persian: دودانگه
- Village
- Location within Iran
- Coordinates: 33°55′41″N 48°56′29″E
- Country: Iran
- Province: Lorestan
- County: Borujerd
- District: Central
- Rural District: Darreh Seydi

Population (2016)
  - Total: 275
- Time zone: UTC+3:30 (IRST)

Dodangeh (Persian: دودانگه) (Note: Also romanized as Do Dāngeh, Dodāngeh, Dow Dangeh, Dow Dāngeh, and Dū Dāngeh; also known as Dongīyeh and Dūngiyeh) is a village in Darreh Seydi Rural District of the Central District in Borujerd County, Lorestan province, Iran.

== Demographics ==
=== Population ===
At the time of the 2006 National Census, the village's population was 487 in 111 households. The following census in 2011 counted 461 people in 137 households. The 2016 census measured the population of the village as 275 people in 107 households.
