= Pulak =

Pulak may refer to:

== First Name ==
- Pulak Bandyopadhyay (1931–1999), Indian Bengali lyricist and songwriter
- Pulak Biswas (1941–2013), Indian children's book illustrator
- Pulak Sengupta (born in 1963), Indian petrologist and professor

== Family Name ==
- Cemal Pulak, INA's vice president for Turkey, who directed the excavation of the Uluburun shipwreck.

== Toponyme ==
- Pulak Rud Pey, village of Mazandaran Province, Iran
- Pa Pulak, village of Lorestan Province, Iran
