= Darreh Seydi =

Village in Lorestan province, Iran

Darreh Seydi Persian: دره صيدي
- Village
- Location within Iran
- Coordinates: 33°56′15″N 48°50′03″E
- Country: Iran
- Province: Lorestan
- County: Borujerd
- District: Central
- Rural District: Darreh Seydi

Population (2016)
  - Total: 361
- Time zone: UTC+3:30 (IRST)

Darreh Seydi (Persian: دره صيدي) (Note: Also romanized as Darreh Şeydī and Darreh Şeyydī) is a village in, and the capital of, Darreh Seydi Rural District in the Central District of Borujerd County, Lorestan province, Iran.

== Demographics ==
=== Population ===
At the time of the 2006 National Census, the village's population was 469 in 131 households. The following census in 2011 counted 389 people in 126 households. The 2016 census measured the population of the village as 361 people in 121 households.
