= Tappeh Mowla =

Village in Lorestan province, Iran

Tappeh Mowla Persian: تپه مولا
- Village
- Location within Iran
- Coordinates: 33°58′59″N 49°01′34″E
- Country: Iran
- Province: Lorestan
- County: Borujerd
- District: Central
- Rural District: Darreh Seydi

Population (2016)
  - Total: 247
- Time zone: UTC+3:30 (IRST)

Tappeh Mowla (Persian: تپه مولا) (Note: Also romanized as Tappeh Mowlā) is a village in Darreh Seydi Rural District of the Central District in Borujerd County, Lorestan province, Iran.

== Demographics ==
=== Population ===
At the time of the 2006 National Census, the village's population was 307 in 80 households. The following census in 2011 counted 328 people in 99 households. The 2016 census measured the population of the village as 247 people in 76 households.
