= Pelkan-e Sofla =

Pelkan-e Sofla پلكان سفلي
- Village
- Location within Iran
- Coordinates: 33°46′38″N 48°38′19″E
- Country: Iran
- Province: Lorestan
- County: Borujerd
- Bakhsh: Central
- Rural District: Hemmatabad

Population (2006)
  - Total: 452
- Time zone: UTC+3:30 (IRST)
  - Summer (DST): UTC+4:30 (IRDT)

Pelkan-e Sofla (Persian: پلكان سفلي, also Romanized as Pelkān-e Soflá) is a village in Hemmatabad Rural District, in the Central District of Borujerd County, Lorestan Province, Iran. At the 2006 census, its population was 452, in 98 families.
