= Qapanvari =

Village in Lorestan province, Iran

Qapanvari Persian: قپانوري
- Village
- Location within Iran
- Coordinates: 33°57′52″N 48°54′19″E
- Country: Iran
- Province: Lorestan
- County: Borujerd
- District: Central
- Rural District: Darreh Seydi

Population (2016)
  - Total: 234
- Time zone: UTC+3:30 (IRST)

Qapanvari (Persian: قپانوري) (Note: Also romanized as Qapānvarī and Qapānwari) is a village in Darreh Seydi Rural District of the Central District in Borujerd County, Lorestan province, Iran.

== Demographics ==
=== Population ===
At the time of the 2006 National Census, the village's population was 266 in 67 households. The following census in 2011 counted 187 people in 68 households. The 2016 census measured the population of the village as 234 people in 85 households.
