= Qeshlaq, Lorestan =

Village in Lorestan province, Iran

Qeshlaq Persian: قشلاق
- Village
- Location within Iran
- Coordinates: 33°54′52″N 48°48′01″E
- Country: Iran
- Province: Lorestan
- County: Borujerd
- District: Central
- Rural District: Valanjerd

Population (2016)
  - Total: 485
- Time zone: UTC+3:30 (IRST)

Qeshlaq (Persian: قشلاق) (Note: Also romanized as Qeshlāq; also known as Qīshlāq) is a village in Valanjerd Rural District of the Central District in Borujerd County, Lorestan province, Iran.

== Demographics ==
=== Population ===
At the time of the 2006 National Census, the village's population was 503 in 144 households. The following census in 2011 counted 564 people in 164 households. The 2016 census measured the population of the village as of 485 people in 157 households.
