= Sheykh Miri-ye Sadat =

Village in Lorestan province, Iran

Sheykh Miri-ye Sadat Persian: شيخ ميري سادات
- Village
- Location within Iran
- Coordinates: 33°54′28″N 48°41′18″E
- Country: Iran
- Province: Lorestan
- County: Borujerd
- District: Central
- Rural District: Hemmatabad

Population (2016)
  - Total: 1,559
- Time zone: UTC+3:30 (IRST)

Sheykh Miri-ye Sadat (Persian: شيخ ميري سادات) (Note: Also romanized as Sheykh Mīrī-ye Sādāt; also known as Shaikh Mīri and Sheykh Mīrī) is a village in Hemmatabad Rural District of the Central District in Borujerd County, Lorestan province, Iran.

== Demographics ==
=== Population ===
At the time of the 2006 National Census, the village's population was 1,211 in 285 households. The following census in 2011 counted 1,508 people in 399 households. The 2016 census measured the population of the village as 1,559 people in 461 households.
