= Dehgah, Borujerd =

Village in Lorestan province, Iran

Dehgah Persian: ده گاه
- Village
- Location within Iran
- Coordinates: 33°55′35″N 48°50′33″E
- Country: Iran
- Province: Lorestan
- County: Borujerd
- District: Central
- Rural District: Darreh Seydi

Population (2016)
  - Total: 607
- Time zone: UTC+3:30 (IRST)

Dehgah (Persian: ده گاه), (Note: Also romanized as Deh Gāh and Dehgāh; also known as Deygāh) is a village in Darreh Seydi Rural District of the Central District in Borujerd County, Lorestan province, Iran.

== Demographics ==
=== Population ===
At the time of the 2006 National Census, the village's population was 848 in 239 households. The following census in 2011 counted 787 people in 248 households. The 2016 census measured the population of the village as 607 people in 202 households, the most populous in its rural district.
