= Aqai, Borujerd =

Aqai آقایی
- Village
- Location within Iran
- Coordinates: 33°56′27″N 48°49′26″E
- Country: Iran
- Province: Lorestan
- County: Borujerd
- Bakhsh: Central
- Rural District: Darreh Seydi

Population (2006)
  - Total: 135
- Time zone: UTC+3:30 (IRST)
  - Summer (DST): UTC+4:30 (IRDT)

Aqai (Persian: آقایی, also Romanized as Āqā’ī, Aghwāi, and Āqvāī) is a village in Darreh Seydi Rural District, in the Central District of Borujerd County, Lorestan Province, Iran. At the 2006 census, its population was 135, in 35 families.
