= Bardbol, Valanjerd =

Bardbol بردبل
- Village
- Location within Iran
- Coordinates: 33°49′48″N 48°55′12″E
- Country: Iran
- Province: Lorestan
- County: Borujerd
- Bakhsh: Central
- Rural District: Valanjerd

Population (2006)
  - Total: 344
- Time zone: UTC+3:30 (IRST)
  - Summer (DST): UTC+4:30 (IRDT)

Bardbol (Persian: بردبل) is a village in Valanjerd Rural District, in the Central District of Borujerd County, Lorestan Province, Iran. At the 2006 census, its population was 344, in 80 families.
