= Fial, Iran =

Village in Lorestan province, Iran

Fial Persian: فيال
- Village
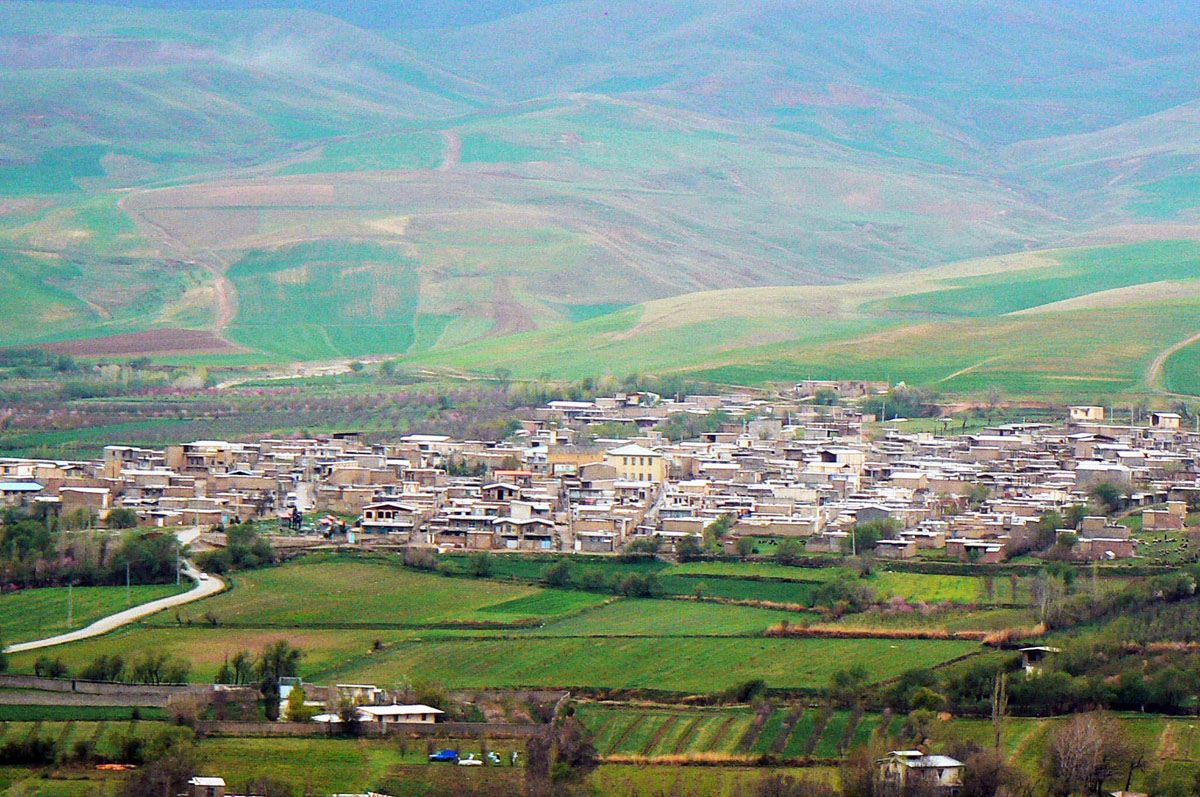
- Fial, 2017

- Location within Iran
- Coordinates: 33°53′48″N 48°42′35″E
- Country: Iran
- Province: Lorestan
- County: Borujerd
- District: Central
- Rural District: Hemmatabad

Population (2016)
  - Total: 2,384
- Time zone: UTC+3:30 (IRST)

Fial (Persian: فيال) (Note: Also romanized as Feyāl, Fīāl, and Fiyāl; also known as Sheykh Mīrī Sādāt) is a village in Hemmatabad Rural District of the Central District in Borujerd County, Lorestan province, Iran.

== Demographics ==
=== Population ===
At the time of the 2006 National Census, the village's population was 2,460 in 607 households. The following census in 2011 counted 2,590 people in 729 households. The 2016 census measured the population of the village as 2,384 people in 728 households.
