= Darrehchi =

Darrehchi (Persian: دره چه) may refer to:

- Darrehchi, East Azerbaijan
- Darrehchi, Lorestan
