= Pelkan =

Pelkan (Persian: پلكان) may refer to:

- Pelkan-e Olya
- Pelkan-e Sofla
