= Hatim =

Hatim may refer to:

- Hatim Aznague (born 1997), Climate change activists
- Hatim ibn Ibrahim (died 1199), Yemeni Da'i al-Mutlaq of the Taiyabi Musta'lī Bohra Islam
- Hatim al-Tai (6th century), ruling prince and poet of the Tayyi tribe of Arabia
- Hatim (horse), a Thoroughbred racehorse
- Hatim (TV series), an Indian TV series based on a Persian story which purports to recount the adventures of the renowned Hatim al-Tai
- Qaleh-ye Hatam, a village in Iran, also known as Ḩātīm
- The Adventures of Hatim, an Indian TV series
- Higher and Technical Institute of Mizoram (HATIM), a college in Mizoram, India

== See also ==
- Hateem, a semi circular wall near Kaaba
- Baba Hatim Ziyarat, a 12th-century Islamic mausoleum in Kunduz, Afghanistan
- Hatimtai (disambiguation)
