= Darreh Bidad-e Pain =

Village in Lorestan province, Iran

Darreh Bidad-e Pain Persian: دره بيداد پايين
- Village
- Location within Iran
- Coordinates: 33°44′15″N 48°40′10″E
- Country: Iran
- Province: Lorestan
- County: Borujerd
- District: Shirvan
- Rural District: Shirvan-e Sharqi

Population (2016)
  - Total: Below reporting threshold
- Time zone: UTC+3:30 (IRST)

Darreh Bidad-e Pain (Persian: دره بيداد پايين) (Note: Also romanized as Darreh Bīdād-e Pā’īn; formerly known as Darreh Bidad-e Sofla (دره بيدادسفلي), also romanized as Darreh Bīdād-e Soflá and Darreh-ye Bīdād-e Soflá; also known as Darreh Bīdād) is a village in Shirvan-e Sharqi Rural District (Note: Formerly Shirvan Rural District) of Shirvan District in Borujerd County, Lorestan province, Iran.

== Demographics ==
=== Population ===
At the time of the 2006 National Census, the village's population, as Darreh Bidad-e Sofla, was 34 in seven households, when it was in Shirvan Rural District (Note: Renamed Shirvan-e Sharqi Rural District) of the Central District. The following census in 2011 counted 14 people in four households, by which time the village was listed as Darreh Bidad-e Pain. The 2016 census measured the population of the village as below the reporting threshold.

In 2021, the rural district was separated from the district in the formation of Shirvan District and renamed Shirvan-e Sharqi Rural District.
