= Sarenjeh, Borujerd =

Village in Lorestan province, Iran

Sarenjeh Persian: سرنجه
- Village
- Location within Iran
- Coordinates: 33°56′11″N 48°56′54″E
- Country: Iran
- Province: Lorestan
- County: Borujerd
- District: Central
- Rural District: Darreh Seydi

Population (2016)
  - Total: 183
- Time zone: UTC+3:30 (IRST)

Sarenjeh (Persian: سرنجه) (Note: Also romanized as Serenjah; also known as Sarinjeh, Sirinjeh, and Sīrīnjeh) is a village in Darreh Seydi Rural District of the Central District in Borujerd County, Lorestan province, Iran.

== Demographics ==
=== Population ===
At the time of the 2006 National Census, the village's population was 363 in 89 households. The following census in 2011 counted 258 people in 83 households. The 2016 census measured the population of the village as 183 people in 64 households.
