= Sang-e Sefid, Borujerd =

Village in Lorestan province, Iran

Sang-e Sefid Persian: سنگ سفيد
- Village
- Location within Iran
- Coordinates: 33°59′53″N 48°54′45″E
- Country: Iran
- Province: Lorestan
- County: Borujerd
- District: Central
- Rural District: Darreh Seydi

Population (2016)
  - Total: 215
- Time zone: UTC+3:30 (IRST)

Sang-e Sefid (Persian: سنگ سفيد) (Note: Also romanized as Sang Sefīd, Sang-e Sefīd, Sang-i-Safīd, and Sang-i-Sefīd; also known as Shab Dāgh, Shāh Badāgh, and Shāh Budāgh) is a village in Darreh Seydi Rural District of the Central District in Borujerd County, Lorestan province, Iran.

== Demographics ==
=== Population ===
At the time of the 2006 National Census, the village's population was 415 in 101 households. The following census in 2011 counted 308 people in 93 households. The 2016 census measured the population of the village as 215 people in 78 households.
