= Valanjerd =

Village in Lorestan province, Iran

Valanjerd Persian: والانجرد
- Village
- Location within Iran
- Coordinates: 33°51′39″N 48°50′01″E
- Country: Iran
- Province: Lorestan
- County: Borujerd
- District: Central
- Rural District: Valanjerd

Population (2016)
  - Total: 1,526
- Time zone: UTC+3:30 (IRST)

Valanjerd (Persian: والانجرد) (Note: Also romanized as Vālānjerd) is a village in, and the capital of, Valanjerd Rural District in the Central District of Borujerd County, Lorestan province, Iran.

== Demographics ==
=== Population ===
At the time of the 2006 National Census, the village's population was 1,457 in 346 households. The following census in 2011 counted 1,581 people in 463 households. The 2016 census measured the population of the village as of 1,526 people in 469 households, the most populous in its rural district.
