= Bichun-e Pain =

Village in Lorestan province, Iran

Bichun-e Pain Persian: بيچون پائين
- Village
- Location within Iran
- Coordinates: 33°53′21″N 48°50′20″E
- Country: Iran
- Province: Lorestan
- County: Borujerd
- District: Central
- Rural District: Valanjerd

Population (2016)
  - Total: 766
- Time zone: UTC+3:30 (IRST)

Bichun-e Pain (Persian: بيچون پائين) (Note: Also romanized as Bīchūn Pā’īn and Bīchūn-e Pāīn; also known as Bīchūn-e Soflá) is a village in Valanjerd Rural District of the Central District in Borujerd County, Lorestan province, Iran.

== Demographics ==
=== Population ===
At the time of the 2006 National Census, the village's population was 829 in 200 households. The following census in 2011 counted 984 people in 287 households. The 2016 census measured the population of the village as of 766 people in 231 households.
