= Gijali =

Gijali (Persian: گيجالي) may refer to:

- Gijali-ye Bala
- Gijali-ye Pain
