= Shah Viran-e Pain =

Shah Viran-e Pain شاه ويران پائين
- Village
- Location within Iran
- Coordinates: 33°50′07″N 48°44′07″E
- Country: Iran
- Province: Lorestan
- County: Borujerd
- Bakhsh: Central
- Rural District: Hemmatabad

Population (2006)
  - Total: 255
- Time zone: UTC+3:30 (IRST)
  - Summer (DST): UTC+4:30 (IRDT)

Shah Viran-e Pain (Persian: شاه ويران پائين, also Romanized as Shāh Vīrān-e Pā’īn and Shāhvīrān-e Pā’īn; also known as Shāh Vīrān-e Soflá) is a village in Hemmatabad Rural District, in the Central District of Borujerd County, Lorestan Province, Iran. At the time of the 2006 census, its population was 255, in 58 families.
