= Kabutarlan =

Kabutarlan كبوترلان
- Village
- Location within Iran
- Coordinates: 33°52′44″N 48°55′17″E
- Country: Iran
- Province: Lorestan
- County: Borujerd
- Bakhsh: Central
- Rural District: Valanjerd

Population (2006)
  - Total: 174
- Time zone: UTC+3:30 (IRST)
  - Summer (DST): UTC+4:30 (IRDT)

Kabutarlan (Persian: كبوترلان, also Romanized as Kabūtarlān; also known as Kabūtarān, Kabūtarīān, Kammūtalān, and Kamūtalān) is a village in Valanjerd Rural District, in the Central District of Borujerd County, Lorestan Province, Iran. At the 2006 census, its population was 174, in 41 families.
