= Shah Viran =

Shah Viran (Persian: شاه ويران) may refer to:

- Shah Viran-e Bala
- Shah Viran-e Pain
