= Buria (disambiguation) =

Buria may refer to:

- Buria, an Indian municipality in the Bhiwani district of Haryana
- Buria Baf, a village in Lorestan Province, Iran
- Buría, a civil parish in Simón Planas Municipality, Venezuela
  - Miguel de Buría (c. 1510 – c. 1555), former slave who became King of Buría in Venezuela
- Buria (буря), the Russian word for "tempest", an official nickname for the second Buran-class spaceplane Ptichka.
- Buria (bryozoan), an extinct genus of cyclostome Bryozoan
- Buria rugosa, a junior synonym of the extinct mantis shrimp Sculda pennata

== See also ==
- Burias (disambiguation)
- Bureya (disambiguation)
