= Gijali-ye Bala =

Gijali-ye Bala گيجالي بالا
- Village
- Location within Iran
- Coordinates: 33°57′05″N 48°47′28″E
- Country: Iran
- Province: Lorestan
- County: Borujerd
- Bakhsh: Central
- Rural District: Valanjerd

Population (2006)
  - Total: 257
- Time zone: UTC+3:30 (IRST)
  - Summer (DST): UTC+4:30 (IRDT)

Gijali-ye Bala (Persian: گيجالي بالا, also Romanized as Gījālī-ye Bālā; also known as Gījālī-ye ‘Olyā) is a village in Valanjerd Rural District, in the Central District of Borujerd County, Lorestan Province, Iran. At the 2006 census, its population was 257, in 70 families.
