= Qaleh-ye Mirza Ali =

Village in Lorestan province, Iran

Deh Now-ye Moqaddasi Persian: قلعه ميرزاعلي
- Village
- Location within Iran
- Coordinates: 33°49′30″N 48°51′29″E
- Country: Iran
- Province: Lorestan
- County: Borujerd
- District: Central
- Rural District: Valanjerd

Population (2016)
  - Total: 267
- Time zone: UTC+3:30 (IRST)

Qaleh-ye Mirza Ali (Persian: قلعه ميرزاعلي) (Note: Also romanized as Qal‘eh-ye Mīrzā ‘Alī) is a village in Valanjerd Rural District of the Central District in Borujerd County, Lorestan province, Iran.

== Demographics ==
=== Population ===
At the time of the 2006 National Census, the village's population was 210 in 49 households. The following census in 2011 counted 183 people in 47 households. The 2016 census measured the population of the village as of 267 people in 83 households.
