= Hezar Jerib, Lorestan =

Hezar Jerib هزارجريب
- Village
- Location within Iran
- Coordinates: 33°48′51″N 48°58′08″E
- Country: Iran
- Province: Lorestan
- County: Borujerd
- Bakhsh: Central
- Rural District: Valanjerd

Population (2006)
  - Total: 261
- Time zone: UTC+3:30 (IRST)
  - Summer (DST): UTC+4:30 (IRDT)

Hezar Jerib (Persian: هزارجريب, also Romanized as Hezār Jerīb, Hazār Jarīb, Hazār Jerīb, and Hezār Jarīb) is a village in Valanjerd Rural District, in the Central District of Borujerd County, Lorestan Province, Iran. At the 2006 census, its population was 261, in 69 families.
