= Buryabaf =

Buryabaf بورياباف
- Village
- Location within Iran
- Coordinates: 33°47′57″N 48°43′49″E
- Country: Iran
- Province: Lorestan
- County: Borujerd
- Bakhsh: Central
- Rural District: Hemmatabad

Population (2006)
  - Total: 190
- Time zone: UTC+3:30 (IRST)
  - Summer (DST): UTC+4:30 (IRDT)

Buryabaf (Persian: بورياباف, also Romanized as Būryābāf, Būrā Bāf, Bure Abāf, and Būrīā Bāf) is a village in Hemmatabad Rural District, in the Central District of Borujerd County, Lorestan Province, Iran. At the 2006 census, its population was 190, in 48 families.
