= Sar Tappeh (Sar Tappeh-ye Sofla) =

Sar Tappeh سرتپه
- Village
- Location within Iran
- Coordinates: 33°38′03″N 48°45′18″E
- Country: Iran
- Province: Lorestan
- County: Borujerd
- Bakhsh: Central
- Rural District: Shirvan

Population (2006)
  - Total: 54
- Time zone: UTC+3:30 (IRST)
  - Summer (DST): UTC+4:30 (IRDT)

Sar Tappeh (Persian: سرتپه, also known as Sar Tappeh-ye Soflá and Deh Tappeh) is a village in Shirvan Rural District, in the Central District of Borujerd County, Lorestan Province, Iran. At the 2006 census, its population was 54, in 15 families.
