= Zarem =

Village in Lorestan province, Iran

Zarem Persian: زارم
- Village
- Location within Iran
- Coordinates: 33°48′18″N 48°49′32″E
- Country: Iran
- Province: Lorestan
- County: Borujerd
- District: Shirvan
- Rural District: Shirvan-e Sharqi

Population (2016)
  - Total: 507
- Time zone: UTC+3:30 (IRST)

Zarem (Persian: زارم) (Note: Also romanized as Zārem;; also known as Vārem and Zāharam) is a village in Shirvan-e Sharqi Rural District (Note: Formerly Shirvan Rural District) of Shirvan District in Borujerd County, Lorestan province, Iran.

== Demographics ==
=== Population ===
At the time of the 2006 National Census, the village's population was 479 in 115 households, when it was in Shirvan Rural District (Note: Renamed Shirvan-e Sharqi Rural District) of the Central District. The following census in 2011 counted 560 people in 158 households. The 2016 census measured the population of the village as 507 people in 151 households.

In 2021, the rural district was separated from the district in the formation of Shirvan District and renamed Shirvan-e Sharqi Rural District.
