= Asad Khani =

Village in Lorestan province, Iran

Asad Khani Persian: اسدخاني
- Village
- Location within Iran
- Coordinates: 33°48′04″N 48°48′28″E
- Country: Iran
- Province: Lorestan
- County: Borujerd
- District: Shirvan
- Rural District: Shirvan-e Sharqi

Population (2016)
  - Total: 799
- Time zone: UTC+3:30 (IRST)

Asad Khani (Persian: اسدخاني) (Note: Also romanized as Asad Khānī; also known as Asad Khāneh and Kartūl) is a village in Shirvan-e Sharqi Rural District (Note: Formerly Shirvan Rural District) of Shirvan District in Borujerd County, Lorestan province, Iran.

== Demographics ==
=== Population ===
At the time of the 2006 National Census, the village's population was 690 in 181 households, when it was in Shirvan Rural District (Note: Renamed Shirvan-e Sharqi Rural District) of the Central District. The following census in 2011 counted 651 people in 191 households. The 2016 census measured the population of the village as 799 people in 248 households.

In 2021, the rural district was separated from the district in the formation of Shirvan District and renamed Shirvan-e Sharqi Rural District.
