= Zereshgeh =

Village in Lorestan province, Iran

Zereshgeh Persian: زرشگه
- Village
- Location within Iran
- Coordinates: 33°51′39″N 48°42′36″E
- Country: Iran
- Province: Lorestan
- County: Borujerd
- District: Central
- Rural District: Hemmatabad

Population (2016)
  - Total: 1,516
- Time zone: UTC+3:30 (IRST)

Zereshgeh (Persian: زرشگه) (Note: Also romanized as Zereshgāh; also known as Zarishkah) is a village in Hemmatabad Rural District of the Central District in Borujerd County, Lorestan province, Iran.

== Demographics ==
=== Population ===
At the time of the 2006 National Census, the village's population was 1,185 in 279 households. The following census in 2011 counted 1,470 people in 405 households. The 2016 census measured the population of the village as 1,516 people in 441 households.
