= Qaleh Now-e Falak ol Din =

Village in Lorestan province, Iran

Qaleh Now-e Falak ol Din Persian: قلعه نوفلک الدين
- Village
- Location within Iran
- Coordinates: 33°51′21″N 48°45′57″E
- Country: Iran
- Province: Lorestan
- County: Borujerd
- District: Central
- Rural District: Hemmatabad

Population (2016)
  - Total: 1,197
- Time zone: UTC+3:30 (IRST)

Qaleh Now-e Falak ol Din (Persian: قلعه نوفلک الدين) (Note: Also romanized as Qal‘eh Now-e Falak ol Dīn) is a village in Hemmatabad Rural District of the Central District in Borujerd County, Lorestan province, Iran.

== Demographics ==
=== Population ===
At the time of the 2011 National Census, the village's population was 1,427 in 373 households. The 2016 census measured the population of the village as 1,197 people in 345 households.
