= Qaleh-ye Absardeh =

Qaleh-ye Absardeh قلعه ابسرده
- Village
- Location within Iran
- Coordinates: 33°47′37″N 48°36′27″E
- Country: Iran
- Province: Lorestan
- County: Borujerd
- Bakhsh: Central
- Rural District: Hemmatabad

Population (2006)
  - Total: 101
- Time zone: UTC+3:30 (IRST)
  - Summer (DST): UTC+4:30 (IRDT)

Qaleh-ye Absardeh (Persian: قلعه ابسرده, also Romanized as Qal‘eh-ye Ābsardeh) is a village in Hemmatabad Rural District, in the Central District of Borujerd County, Lorestan Province, Iran. At the 2006 census, its population was 101, in 16 families.
