= Falak ol Din =

Village in Lorestan province, Iran

Falak ol Din Persian: فلك الدين
- Village
- Location within Iran
- Coordinates: 33°51′28″N 48°46′19″E
- Country: Iran
- Province: Lorestan
- County: Borujerd
- District: Central
- Rural District: Hemmatabad

Population (2016)
  - Total: 1,769
- Time zone: UTC+3:30 (IRST)

Falak ol Din (Persian: فلك الدين) (Note: Also romanized as Falak ol Dīn; also known as Falak od Din, Falak od Dīn, and Falaked Dīn) is a village in Hemmatabad Rural District of the Central District in Borujerd County, Lorestan province, Iran.

== Demographics ==
=== Population ===
At the time of the 2006 National Census, the village's population was 692 in 177 households. The following census in 2011 counted 2,423 people in 660 households. The 2016 census measured the population of the village as 1,012 people in 305 households.
