= Darreh Bidad =

Darreh Bidad (Persian: دره بيداد) may refer to:

- Darreh Bidad-e Olya
- Darreh Bidad-e Sofla
