= Deh Kord =

Deh Kord or Dehkord (Persian: دهكرد) may refer to:

- Dehkord, Isfahan
- Deh Kord, Lorestan
- Shahrekord, Chaharmahal and Bakhtiari Province
