= Gijali-ye Pain =

Village in Lorestan province, Iran

Gijali-ye Pain Persian: گيجالي پائين
- Village
- Location within Iran
- Coordinates: 33°56′59″N 48°46′57″E
- Country: Iran
- Province: Lorestan
- County: Borujerd
- District: Central
- Rural District: Valanjerd

Population (2016)
  - Total: 409
- Time zone: UTC+3:30 (IRST)

Gijali-ye Pain (Persian: گيجالي پائين) (Note: Also romanized as Gījālī-ye Pā’īn; also known as Gījālī-ye Soflá) is a village in Valanjerd Rural District of the Central District in Borujerd County, Lorestan province, Iran.

== Demographics ==
=== Population ===
At the time of the 2006 National Census, the village's population was 416 in 108 households. The following census in 2011 counted 433 people in 136 households. The 2016 census measured the population of the village as of 409 people in 136 households.
