= Badeh =

Badeh (Persian: باده) may refer to:

- Badeh, Borujerd, a village in Borujerd County, Lorestan Province, Iran
- Badeh, Khorramabad, a village in Khorramabad County, Lorestan Province, Iran
