= Pelkan-e Olya =

Pelkan-e Olya پلكان عليا
- Village
- Location within Iran
- Coordinates: 33°46′53″N 48°37′42″E
- Country: Iran
- Province: Lorestan
- County: Borujerd
- Bakhsh: Central
- Rural District: Hemmatabad

Population (2006)
  - Total: 155
- Time zone: UTC+3:30 (IRST)
  - Summer (DST): UTC+4:30 (IRDT)

Pelkan-e Olya (Persian: پلكان عليا, also Romanized as Pelkān-e ‘Olyā and Palkān-e ‘Olyā; also known as Āb Sardeh-ye Soflá, Palkān-e ‘Alā’īn, and Pellehkān-e Bālā) is a village in Hemmatabad Rural District, in the Central District of Borujerd County, Lorestan Province, Iran. At the 2006 census, its population was 155, in 37 families.
