= Cham Seyyedi-ye Olya =

Cham Seyyedi-ye Olya چم صیدی علیا
- Village
- Location within Iran
- Coordinates: 33°45′52″N 48°39′54″E
- Country: Iran
- Province: Lorestan
- County: Borujerd
- Bakhsh: Central
- Rural District: Hemmatabad

Population (2006)
  - Total: 71
- Time zone: UTC+3:30 (IRST)
  - Summer (DST): UTC+4:30 (IRDT)

Cham Seyyedi-ye Olya (Persian: چم صیدی علیا, also Romanized as Cham Seyyedī-ye 'Olyā and Cham Şeyd-e 'Olyā) is a village in Hemmatabad Rural District, in the Central District of Borujerd County, Lorestan province, Iran. At the 2006 census, its population was 71, in 12 families.
