= Vajihabad =

Vajihabad (Persian: وجيه اباد) may refer to:

- Vajihabad, Lorestan
- Vajihabad, Qazvin
