= Deh Kord, Lorestan =

Village in Lorestan province, Iran

Deh Kord Persian: دهكرد
- Village
- Location within Iran
- Coordinates: 33°49′30″N 48°53′24″E
- Country: Iran
- Province: Lorestan
- County: Borujerd
- District: Central
- Rural District: Valanjerd

Population (2016)
  - Total: 835
- Time zone: UTC+3:30 (IRST)

Deh Kord (Persian: دهكرد) (Note: Also romanized as Deh-e Kord; also knowwn as Deh-e Kūrd and Deh-ī-Kurd) is a village in Valanjerd Rural District of the Central District in Borujerd County, Lorestan province, Iran.

== Demographics ==
=== Population ===
At the time of the 2006 National Census, the village's population was 1,255 in 307 households. The following census in 2011 counted 987 people in 291 households. The 2016 census measured the population of the village as of 835 people in 288 households.
