= Qaleh-ye Hatam =

Village in Lorestan province, Iran

Qaleh-ye Hatam Persian: قلعه حاتم
- Village
- Location within Iran
- Coordinates: 33°55′47″N 48°43′00″E
- Country: Iran
- Province: Lorestan
- County: Borujerd
- District: Central
- Rural District: Hemmatabad

Population (2016)
  - Total: 3,319
- Time zone: UTC+3:30 (IRST)

Qaleh-ye Hatam (Persian: قلعه حاتم) (Note: Also romanized as Qal‘eh Ḩātam and Qal‘eh-ye Hātam; also known as Ḩātīm) is a village in Hemmatabad Rural District of the Central District in Borujerd County, Lorestan province, Iran.

== Demographics ==
=== Population ===
At the time of the 2006 National Census, the village's population was 2,486 in 641 households. The following census in 2011 counted 3,337 people in 938 households. The 2016 census measured the population of the village as 3,319 people in 1,037 households.
