= Cham Seyyedi-ye Sofla =

Cham Seyyedi-ye Sofla چم صیدی سفلی
- Village
- Location within Iran
- Coordinates: 33°45′46″N 48°40′24″E
- Country: Iran
- Province: Lorestan
- County: Borujerd
- Bakhsh: Central
- Rural District: Hemmatabad

Population (2006)
  - Total: 23
- Time zone: UTC+3:30 (IRST)
  - Summer (DST): UTC+4:30 (IRDT)

Cham Seyyedi-ye Sofla (Persian: چم صیدی سفلی, also Romanized as Cham Seyyedī-ye Soflá and Cham Şeyd-e Soflá) is a village in Hemmatabad Rural District, in the Central District of Borujerd County, Lorestan Province, Iran. At the 2006 census, its population was 23, in 5 families.
