= Varem =

Varem may refer to:

- Hilja Varem (born 1934), Estonian actress
- Jeff Varem (born 1983), Nigerian basketball player
- Zarem, a village in Iran
