= Kartul =

Kartul (Persian: كرتول) may refer to:

- Kartul, Hamadan
- Kartul, Lorestan
