= Aqai =

Aqai may refer to:

- Açaí palm, a tree
- Aqai, Azna, Lorestan Province, Iran
- Aqai, Borujerd, Lorestan Province, Iran
