= Darreh Chapi, Lorestan =

Darreh Chapi دره چپي
- Village
- Location within Iran
- Coordinates: 33°46′56″N 48°43′16″E
- Country: Iran
- Province: Lorestan
- County: Borujerd
- Bakhsh: Central
- Rural District: Hemmatabad

Population (2006)
  - Total: 56
- Time zone: UTC+3:30 (IRST)
  - Summer (DST): UTC+4:30 (IRDT)

Darreh Chapi (Persian: دره چپي, also Romanized as Darreh Chapī and Darreh-ye Chapī; also known as Darrehchī) is a village in Hemmatabad Rural District, in the Central District of Borujerd County, Lorestan Province, Iran. At the 2006 census, its population was 56, in 11 families.
