= Shirvan-e Gharbi Rural District =

Rural district in Lorestan province, Iran

Shirvan-e Gharbi Rural District Persian: دهستان شیروان غربی
- Rural District
- Location within Iran
- Coordinates: 33°42′N 48°45′E
- Country: Iran
- Province: Lorestan
- County: Borujerd
- District: Shirvan
- Established: 2021
- Capital: Boz-e Azna
- Time zone: UTC+3:30 (IRST)

Shirvan-e Gharbi Rural District (Persian: دهستان شیروان غربی) is in Shirvan District of Borujerd County, Lorestan province, Iran. Its capital is the village of Boz-e Azna, whose population at the time of the 2016 National Census was 905 in 280 households.

== History ==
In 2021, Shirvan Rural District (Note: Renamed Shirvan-e Sharqi Rural District) was separated from the Central District in the formation of Shirvan District, and Shirvan-e Gharbi Rural District was created in the new district.

== Other villages in the rural district ==
- Ab Dar
- Alkabad
- Bardbol
- Besri
- Chegeni Kosh
- Dar Tut
- Darb-e Astaneh Khalid Ebn Ali
- Darreh Kabud
- Deh Sefid
- Deh Sorkheh
- Dinarabad
- Eslamabad
- Ganjineh
- Kenarvand
- Khan Amir
- Korkor
- Khvoabad
- Pa Pulak
- Pir Sharif
- Qaleh Shekar
- Sar Tappeh-ye Bala
- Sinabad
- Tang-e Mohammad Hajji
- Ud-e Mulla
- Vajihabad
