= Qaleh-ye Mohammad Zia =

Village in Lorestan province, Iran

Qaleh-ye Mohammad Zia Persian: قلعه محمدضيا
- Village
- Location within Iran
- Coordinates: 33°55′43″N 48°54′59″E
- Country: Iran
- Province: Lorestan
- County: Borujerd
- District: Central
- Rural District: Darreh Seydi

Population (2016)
  - Total: 115
- Time zone: UTC+3:30 (IRST)

Qaleh-ye Mohammad Zia (Persian: قلعه محمدضيا) (Note: Also romanized as Qal‘eh-ye Moḩammad Ẕīā’; also known as Qal‘eh Maziyād and Qal‘eh-ye Mazīād) is a village in Darreh Seydi Rural District of the Central District in Borujerd County, Lorestan province, Iran.

== Demographics ==
=== Population ===
At the time of the 2006 National Census, the village's population was 157 in 37 households. The following census in 2011 counted 128 people in 43 households. The 2016 census measured the population of the village as 115 people in 38 households.
