= Cham Seyyedi-ye Vosta =

Cham Seyyedi-ye Vosta چم صیدی وسطی
- Village
- Location within Iran
- Coordinates: 33°45′54″N 48°40′13″E
- Country: Iran
- Province: Lorestan
- County: Borujerd
- Bakhsh: Central
- Rural District: Hemmatabad

Population (2006)
  - Total: 75
- Time zone: UTC+3:30 (IRST)
  - Summer (DST): UTC+4:30 (IRDT)

Cham Seyyedi-ye Vosta (Persian: چم صیدی وسطی, also Romanized as Cham Seyyedī-ye Vosţá and Cham Şeyd-e Vosţá; also known as Cham-e Seyyed and Cham-e Şeydī) is a village in Hemmatabad Rural District, in the Central District of Borujerd County, Lorestan Province, Iran. At the 2006 census, its population was 75, in 15 families.
