= Burias =

Burias can refer to:

- Burias (island), Philippines
- Burias Pass, strait in the Philippines
- Buriaş, a village in Periş commune, Ilfov county, Romania
- Buriaš, a Kassite deity
- Burna-Buriash II, a king in the Kassite dynasty of Babylon
- Kadašman-Buriaš, a Babylonian governor
- USS Burias (AG-69), a U.S. Navy ship

== See also ==
- Buria (disambiguation)
