= Kamarsheh Seyyedi Dallah =

Kamarsheh Seyyedi Dallah کمرشه سیدیدالله
- Village
- Country: Iran
- Province: Khuzestan
- County: Andika
- Bakhsh: Central
- Rural District: Shalal and Dasht-e Gol

Population (2006)
  - Total: 50
- Time zone: UTC+3:30 (IRST)
  - Summer (DST): UTC+4:30 (IRDT)

Kamarsheh Seyyedi Dallah (Persian: کمرشه سیدیدالله, also Romanized as Kamarsheh Seyyedī Dāllah) is a village in Shalal and Dasht-e Gol Rural District, in the Central District of Andika County, Khuzestan Province, Iran. At the 2006 census, its population was 50, in 7 families.
