= Darreh Chapi, Ilam =

Darreh Chapi دره چپي
- Village
- Location within Iran
- Coordinates: 33°37′44″N 46°52′41″E
- Country: Iran
- Province: Ilam
- County: Chardavol
- Bakhsh: Zagros
- Rural District: Bijnavand

Population (2006)
  - Total: 165
- Time zone: UTC+3:30 (IRST)
  - Summer (DST): UTC+4:30 (IRDT)

Darreh Chapi (Persian: دره چپي, also Romanized as Darreh Chapī; also known as Darreh Chīnī) is a village in Bijnavand Rural District, in the Zagros District of Chardavol County, Ilam Province, Iran. At the 2006 census, its population was 165, in 33 families. The village is populated by Kurds.
