= Ab Sardeh, Chaharmahal and Bakhtiari =

Ab Sardeh ابسرده
- Village
- Location within Iran
- Coordinates: 31°55′19″N 50°30′32″E
- Country: Iran
- Province: Chaharmahal and Bakhtiari
- County: Ardal
- Bakhsh: Central
- Rural District: Dinaran

Population (2006)
  - Total: 370
- Time zone: UTC+3:30 (IRST)
  - Summer (DST): UTC+4:30 (IRDT)

Ab Sardeh (Persian: ابسرده, also Romanized as Āb Sardeh) is a village in Dinaran Rural District, in the Central District of Ardal County, Chaharmahal and Bakhtiari province, Iran. At the 2006 census, its population was 370, in 86 families. The village is populated by Lurs.
