= Bureya =

Bureya may refer to:

- Bureya (river), a tributary of the Amur in Amur Oblast and Khabarovsk Krai, Russia
  - Bureya Dam, a hydroelectric dam on the Bureya river
  - Bureya grayling, a fish found in the Bureya river
- Bureya, Russia, an urban-type settlement in Amur Oblast, Russia
- Bureya Range, a mountain chain in the Russian Far East
- Bureya Nature Reserve, a protected area of Russia
