= Bardbol, Selseleh =

Bardbal بردبل
- village
- Location within Iran
- Coordinates: 33°48′16″N 48°18′22″E
- Country: Iran
- Province: Lorestan
- County: Selseleh
- Bakhsh: Central
- Rural District: Honam

Population (2021)
  - Total: 131
- Time zone: UTC+3:30 (IRST)
  - Summer (DST): UTC+4:30 (IRDT)

Bardbal (Persian: بردبل, also Romanized as Bard Bal) is a village in Honam Rural District, in the Central District of Selseleh County, Lorestan Province, Iran. At the 2006 census, its population was 131, in 27 families.
