= Absardeh, Aligudarz =

Absardeh ابسرده
- Village
- Location within Iran
- Coordinates: 33°10′16″N 49°13′35″E
- Country: Iran
- Province: Lorestan
- County: Aligudarz
- Bakhsh: Zaz and Mahru
- Rural District: Zaz-e Sharqi

Population (2006)
  - Total: 107
- Time zone: UTC+3:30 (IRST)
  - Summer (DST): UTC+4:30 (IRDT)

Absardeh (Persian: ابسرده, also Romanized as Ābsardeh; also known as Āb Sardeh-ye Seh Sok) is a village in Zaz-e Sharqi Rural District, Zaz and Mahru District, Aligudarz County, Lorestan Province, Iran.

== Population ==
At the 2006 census, its population was 107, in 20 families.
