= Sufi Seyyedi =

Sufi Seyyedi صوفی سیدی
- Village
- Country: Iran
- Province: Sistan and Baluchestan
- County: Hirmand
- Bakhsh: Central
- Rural District: Margan

Population (2006)
  - Total: 259
- Time zone: UTC+3:30 (IRST)
  - Summer (DST): UTC+4:30 (IRDT)

Sufi Seyyedi (Persian: صوفی سیدی, also Romanized as Şūfī Seyyedī) is a village in Margan Rural District, in the Central District of Hirmand County, Sistan and Baluchestan Province, Iran. At the 2006 census, its population was 259, in 46 families.
