= Darrehcheh =

Darrehcheh دره چه
- Village
- Location within Iran
- Coordinates: 37°47′05″N 46°59′47″E
- Country: Iran
- Province: East Azerbaijan
- County: Bostanabad
- Bakhsh: Tekmeh Dash
- Rural District: Abbas-e Gharbi

Population (2006)
  - Total: 55
- Time zone: UTC+3:30 (IRST)
  - Summer (DST): UTC+4:30 (IRDT)

Darrehcheh (Persian: دره چه; also known as Darrehchī) is a village in Abbas-e Gharbi Rural District, Tekmeh Dash District, Bostanabad County, East Azerbaijan Province, Iran. At the 2006 census, its population was 55, in 10 families.
