= Darreh Chapi-ye Jowkar =

Village in Kohgiluyeh and Boyer-Ahmad, Iran

Darreh Chapi-ye Jowkar دره چپي جوكار
- Village
- Location within Iran
- Coordinates: 31°05′25″N 50°55′26″E
- Country: Iran
- Province: Kohgiluyeh and Boyer-Ahmad
- County: Boyer-Ahmad
- Bakhsh: Margown
- Rural District: Margown

Population (2006)
  - Total: 64
- Time zone: UTC+3:30 (IRST)
  - Summer (DST): UTC+4:30 (IRDT)

Darreh Chapi-ye Jowkar (Persian: دره چپي جوكار, also Romanized as Darreh Chapī-ye Jowkār; also known as Darreh Chapī) is a village in Margown Rural District, Margown District, Boyer-Ahmad County, Kohgiluyeh and Boyer-Ahmad Province, Iran. At the 2006 census, its population was 64, in 13 families.
