= Seyyedi Bazar =

Seyyedi Bazar سیدی بازار
- Village
- Location within Iran
- Coordinates: 25°38′56″N 60°59′10″E
- Country: Iran
- Province: Sistan and Baluchestan
- County: Chabahar
- Bakhsh: Central
- Rural District: Pir Sohrab

Population (2006)
  - Total: 153
- Time zone: UTC+3:30 (IRST)
  - Summer (DST): UTC+4:30 (IRDT)

Seyyedi Bazar (Persian: سیدی بازار, also Romanized as Seyyedī Bāzār) is a village in Pir Sohrab Rural District, in the Central District of Chabahar County, Sistan and Baluchestan Province, Iran. At the 2006 census, its population was 153, in 30 families.
