= Hatimtai =

Hatimtai may refer to:

- Hatim al-Tai, a pre-Islamic (Jahiliyyah) Arabian poet
- Hatimtai (1929 film), a 1929 Indian film
- Hatimtai (1933 film), a 1933 Indian film
- Hatimtai (1947 film), a 1947 Indian film
- Hatim Tai (1956 film), a 1956 Indian film
- Haatim Tai (1990 film), a 1990 Indian film
- Hatimtai Ki Beti, a 1955 Indian film
- Son of Hatimtai, a 1965 Indian film
