= Hezar Jerib, Chaharmahal and Bakhtiari =

Hezar Jerib هزارجريب
- Village
- Location within Iran
- Coordinates: 31°21′35″N 50°48′16″E
- Country: Iran
- Province: Chaharmahal and Bakhtiari
- County: Lordegan
- Bakhsh: Central
- Rural District: Sardasht

Population (2006)
  - Total: 14
- Time zone: UTC+3:30 (IRST)
  - Summer (DST): UTC+4:30 (IRDT)

Hezar Jerib (Persian: هزارجريب, also Romanized as Hezār Jerīb) is a village in Sardasht Rural District, in the Central District of Lordegan County, Chaharmahal and Bakhtiari Province, Iran. At the 2006 census, its population was 14, in 4 families. The village is populated by Lurs.
