= Hezar Jerib, Hamadan =

Hezar Jerib هزارجريب
- Village
- Location within Iran
- Coordinates: 34°20′33″N 48°32′05″E
- Country: Iran
- Province: Hamadan
- County: Malayer
- Bakhsh: Samen
- Rural District: Haram Rud-e Sofla

Population (2006)
  - Total: 178
- Time zone: UTC+3:30 (IRST)
  - Summer (DST): UTC+4:30 (IRDT)

Hezar Jerib (Persian: هزارجريب, also Romanized as Ḩezār Jerīb, Hezār Jarīb, Hazār Jarīb, and Hazār Jerīb) is a village in Haram Rud-e Sofla Rural District, Samen District, Malayer County, Hamadan Province, Iran. At the 2006 census, its population was 178, in 46 families.
