= Mohammadabad, Shirvan =

Mohammadabad محمداباد
- Village
- Location within Iran
- Coordinates: 37°28′22″N 57°57′58″E
- Country: Iran
- Province: North Khorasan
- County: Shirvan
- Bakhsh: Central
- Rural District: Ziarat

Population (2006)
  - Total: 134
- Time zone: UTC+3:30 (IRST)
  - Summer (DST): UTC+4:30 (IRDT)

Mohammadabad (Persian: محمداباد, also Romanized as Moḩammadābād; also known as Moḩammad ‘Alī Khān (Persian: محمدعليخان), Qal‘eh-ye Moḩammad, and Qal‘eh-ye Moḩammad ‘Alī Khān) is a village in Ziarat Rural District, in the Central District of Shirvan County, North Khorasan Province, Iran. At the 2006 census, its population was 134, in 35 families.
