= Sartapah, Kermanshah =

Sartapah سرتپه
- Village
- Location within Iran
- Coordinates: 34°20′41″N 46°30′11″E
- Country: Iran
- Province: Kermanshah
- County: Kermanshah
- Bakhsh: Mahidasht
- Rural District: Chaqa Narges

Population (2006)
  - Total: 89
- Time zone: UTC+3:30 (IRST)
  - Summer (DST): UTC+4:30 (IRDT)

Sartapah (Persian: سرتپه, also Romanized as Sartappeh) is a village in Chaqa Narges Rural District, Mahidasht District, Kermanshah County, Kermanshah Province, Iran. At the 2006 census, its population was 89, in 17 families.
