= Gashur-e Qaleh Mohammad =

Gashur-e Qaleh Mohammad گشورقلعه محمد
- Village
- Location within Iran
- Coordinates: 34°13′56″N 47°43′17″E
- Country: Iran
- Province: Lorestan
- County: Delfan
- Bakhsh: Kakavand
- Rural District: Kakavand-e Sharqi

Population (2006)
  - Total: 49
- Time zone: UTC+3:30 (IRST)
  - Summer (DST): UTC+4:30 (IRDT)

Gashur-e Qaleh Mohammad (Persian: گشورقلعه محمد, also Romanized as Gashūr-e Qal‘eh Moḩammad; also known as Qal‘eh Moḩammad, Kalām-i- Ahmad, Keshvar Qal‘eh Moḩammad, Qal‘eh-ye Moḩammad, and Qolā Moḩammad) is a village in Kakavand-e Sharqi Rural District, Kakavand District, Delfan County, Lorestan Province, Iran. At the 2006 census, its population was 49, in 11 families.
