= Valanjerd Rural District =

Rural district in Lorestan province, Iran

Valanjerd Rural District Persian: دهستان والانجرد
- Rural District
- Location within Iran
- Coordinates: 33°53′N 48°53′E
- Country: Iran
- Province: Lorestan
- County: Borujerd
- District: Central
- Established: 1987
- Capital: Valanjerd

Population (2016)
  - Total: 6,510
- Time zone: UTC+3:30 (IRST)

Valanjerd Rural District (Persian: دهستان والانجرد) is in the Central District of Borujerd County, Lorestan province, Iran. Its capital is the village of Valanjerd.

== Demographics ==
=== Population ===
At the time of the 2006 National Census, the rural district's population was 7,607 in 1,883 households. There were 7,323 inhabitants in 2,166 households at the following census of 2011. The 2016 census measured the population of the rural district as 6,510 in 2,116 households. The most populous of its 25 villages was Valanjerd, with 1,526 people.

=== Other villages in the rural district ===
- Bichun-e Pain
- Dehh Kord
- Deh Now-ye Moqaddasi
- Gijali-ye Pain
- Qaleh-ye Mirza Ali
- Qeshlaq
