= Darreh Seydi Rural District =

Rural district in Lorestan province, Iran

Darreh Seydi Rural District Persian: دهستان دره صيدئ
- Rural District
- Location within Iran
- Coordinates: 33°58′N 48°56′E
- Country: Iran
- Province: Lorestan
- County: Borujerd
- District: Central
- Established: 1990
- Capital: Darreh Seydi

Population (2016)
  - Total: 3,279
- Time zone: UTC+3:30 (IRST)

Darreh Seydi Rural District (Persian: دهستان دره صيدئ) is in the Central District of Borujerd County, Lorestan province, Iran. Its capital is the village of Darreh Seydi.

== Demographics ==
=== Population ===
At the time of the 2006 National Census, the rural district's population was 5,066 in 1,276 households. There were 4,221 inhabitants in 1,325 households at the following census of 2011. The 2016 census measured the population of the rural district as 3,279 in 1,131 households. The most populous of its 31 villages was Dehgah, with 607 people.

=== Other villages in the rural district ===
- Dodangeh
- Qaleh-ye Mohammad Zia
- Qapanvari
- Sang-e Sefid
- Sarenjeh
- Tappeh Mowla
