= Hemmatabad Rural District =

Rural district in Lorestan province, Iran

Hemmatabad Rural District Persian: دهستان همت آباد
- Rural District
- Location within Iran
- Coordinates: 33°51′N 48°43′E
- Country: Iran
- Province: Lorestan
- County: Borujerd
- District: Central
- Established: 1987
- Capital: Meynal

Population (2016)
  - Total: 27,016
- Time zone: UTC+3:30 (IRST)

Hemmatabad Rural District (Persian: دهستان همت آباد) is in the Central District of Borujerd County, Lorestan province, Iran. Its capital is the village of Meynal. The previous capital of the rural district was the village of Hemmatabad, now in Shirvan-e Sharqi Rural District.

== Demographics ==
=== Population ===
At the time of the 2006 National Census, the rural district's population was 23,249 in 5,630 households. There were 29,007 inhabitants in 7,783 households at the following census of 2011. The 2016 census measured the population of the rural district as 27,016 in 7,923 households. The most populous of its 58 villages was Jahanabad (now a neighborhood in the city of Borujerd), with 4,581 people.

=== Other villages in the rural district ===
- Falak ol Din
- Fial
- Qaleh Now-e Falak ol Din
- Qaleh-ye Hatam
- Sheykh Miri-ye Sadat
- Zereshgeh
