= Shirvan-e Sharqi Rural District =

Rural district in Lorestan province, Iran

Shirvan-e Sharqi Rural District Persian: دهستان شیروان شرقی
- Rural District
- Location within Iran
- Coordinates: 33°45′57″N 48°52′29″E
- Country: Iran
- Province: Lorestan
- County: Borujerd
- District: Shirvan
- Established: 1987
- Capital: Khayan

Population (2016)
  - Total: 21,662
- Time zone: UTC+3:30 (IRST)

Shirvan-e Sharqi Rural District (Persian: دهستان شیروان شرقی) (Note: Formerly Shirvan Rural District (دهستان شیروان)) is in Shirvan District of Borujerd County, Lorestan province, Iran. Its capital is the village of Khayan. The previous capital of the rural district was the village of Sharkat Zarayi Shirvan Chafa. (Note: Renamed Shirvan)

== Demographics ==
=== Population ===
At the time of the 2006 National Census, the rural district's population (as Shirvan Rural District of the Central District) was 21,710 in 5,351 households. There were 22,948 inhabitants in 6,475 households at the following census of 2011. The 2016 census measured the population of the rural district as 21,662 in 6,462 households. The most populous of its 64 villages was Khayan, with 2,148 people.

In 2021, the rural district was separated from the district in the formation of Shirvan District and renamed Shirvan-e Sharqi Rural District.

=== Other villages in the rural district ===
- Abbasabad
- Asad Khani
- Badeh
- Cheshmeh Kabud
- Darreh Bidad-e Bala
- Darreh Bidad-e Pain
- Deliabad
- Gusheh-ye Mohsen Ebn-e Ali
- Hemmatabad
- Kahriz
- Kapar Judaki
- Karvaneh
- Keydan
- Nel Khvast-e Bala
- Qaleh Now-ye Showkati
- Qarah Su
- Qoroq
- Rahimabad
- Sarab-e Zarem
- Shisheh
- Tabarijan
- Taheriabad
- Tanjur
- Valian
- Zarem
