= Shirvan District (Borujerd County) =

District in Lorestan province, Iran

Shirvan District Persian: بخش شیروان
- District
- Location within Iran
- Coordinates: 33°43′18″N 48°49′31″E
- Country: Iran
- Province: Lorestan
- County: Borujerd
- Established: 2021
- Capital: Shirvan
- Time zone: UTC+3:30 (IRST)

Shirvan District (Persian: بخش شیروان) is in Borujerd County, Lorestan province, Iran. Its capital is the village of Shirvan, whose population at the time of the 2016 National Census was 1,051 people in 326 households.

== History ==
In 2021, Shirvan Rural District (Note: Renamed Shirvan-e Sharqi Rural District) was separated from the Central District in the formation of Shirvan District.

== Demographics ==
=== Administrative divisions ===
Shirvan District
Administrative Divisions
Shirvan-e Gharbi RD
Shirvan-e Sharqi RD (Note: Formerly Shirvan Rural District)
RD = Rural District
