= Borujerd County =

County in Lorestan province, Iran

Borujerd County Persian: شهرستان بروجرد
- County
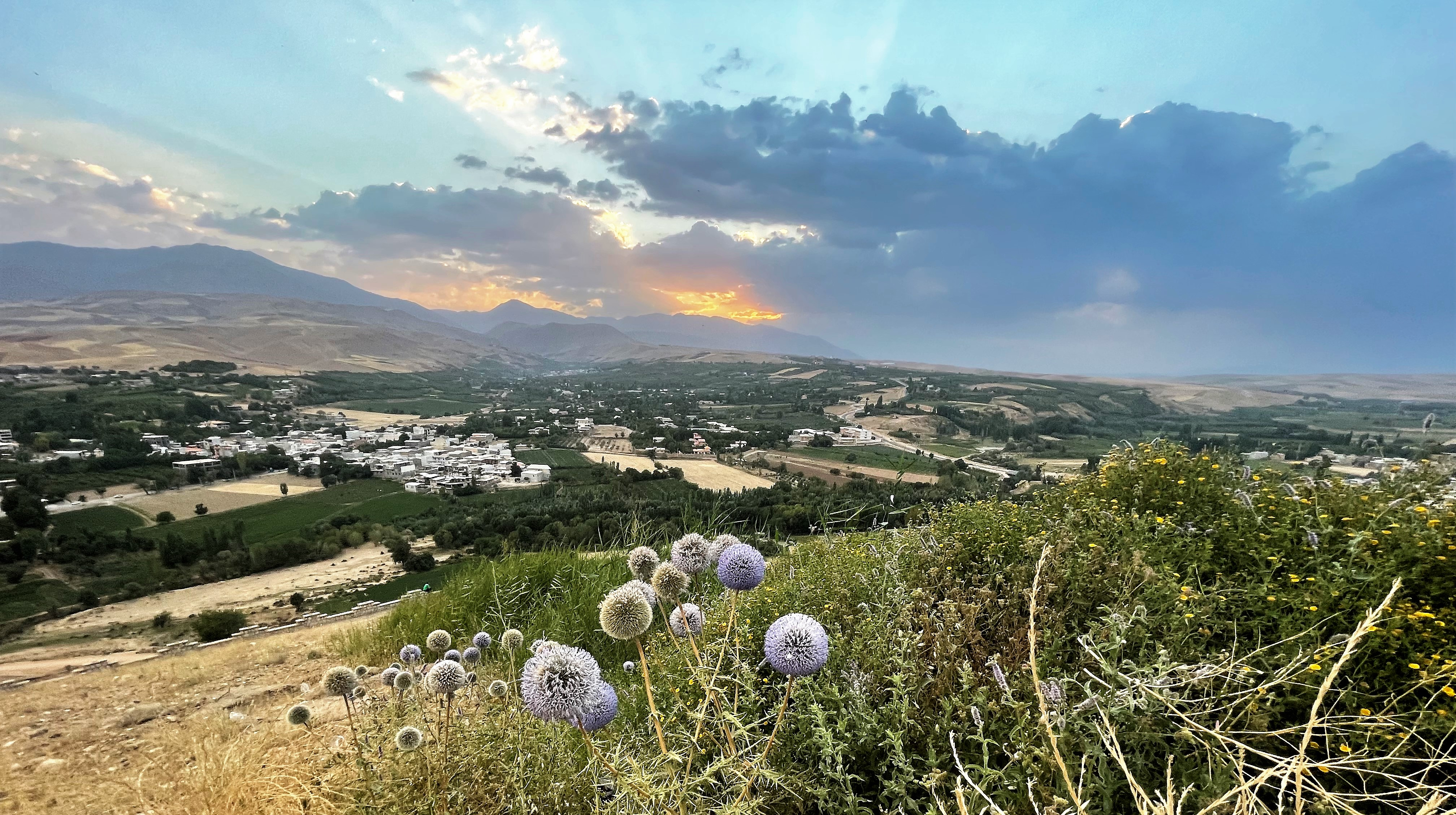
- Landscape in Borujerd County

- Location of Borujerd County in Lorestan province (top, green)

- Location of Lorestan province in Iran
- Coordinates: 33°52′N 48°45′E
- Country: Iran
- Province: Lorestan
- Capital: Borujerd
- Districts: Central, Oshtorinan, Shirvan

Population (2016)
  - Total: 326,452
- Time zone: UTC+3:30 (IRST)

Borujerd County (Persian: شهرستان بروجرد) is in Lorestan province, Iran. Its capital is the city of Borujerd.

== History ==
In 2021, Shirvan Rural District (Note: Renamed Shirvan-e Sharqi Rural District) was separated from the Central District in the formation of Shirvan District, including the new Shirvan-e Gharbi Rural District. The village of Vanai was converted to a city in 2019.

== Demographics ==
=== Population ===
At the time of the 2006 National Census, the county's population was 320,547 in 82,676 households. The following census in 2011 counted 337,631 people in 99,259 households. The 2016 census measured the population of the county as 326,452 in 102,258 households.

=== Administrative divisions ===
Borujerd County's population history and administrative structure over three consecutive censuses are shown in the following table.

Borujerd County Population
Administrative Divisions	2006	2011	2016
Central District	285,179	304,153	293,464
Darreh Seydi RD	5,066	4,221	3,279
Hemmatabad RD	23,249	29,007	27,016
Shirvan RD	21,710	22,948	21,662
Valanjerd RD	7,607	7,323	6,510
Borujerd (city)	227,547	240,654	234,997
Oshtorinan District (Note: Formerly Ashtad District)	35,368	33,478	32,988
Bardesareh RD	7,530	7,170	6,853
Gudarzi RD	16,875	16,321	16,375
Oshtorinan RD	5,699	4,904	4,240
Oshtorinan (city)	5,264	5,083	5,520
Vanai (city) (Note: Became a city after the 2016 census)			
Shirvan District (Note: Established after the 2016 census)			
Shirvan-e Gharbi RD			
Shirvan-e Sharqi RD (Note: Formerly Shirvan Rural District)			
Total	320,547	337,631	326,452
RD = Rural District

== See also ==
Media related to Borujerd County at Wikimedia Commons
