= Central District (Borujerd County) =

District in Lorestan province, Iran

Central District (Borujerd County) Persian: بخش مرکزی شهرستان بروجرد
- District
- Location within Iran
- Coordinates: 33°53′14″N 48°49′25″E
- Country: Iran
- Province: Lorestan
- County: Borujerd
- Capital: Borujerd

Population (2016)
  - Total: 293,464
- Time zone: UTC+3:30 (IRST)

The Central District of Borujerd County (Persian: بخش مرکزی شهرستان بروجرد) is in Lorestan province, Iran. Its capital is the city of Borujerd.

== History ==
In 2021, Shirvan Rural District (Note: Renamed Shirvan-e Sharqi Rural District) was separated from the district in the formation of Shirvan District.

== Demographics ==
=== Population ===
At the time of the 2006 National Census, the district's population was 285,179 in 73,528 households. The following census in 2011 counted 304,153 people in 89,479 households. The 2016 census measured the population of the district as 293,464 inhabitants in 91,778 households.

=== Administrative divisions ===
Central District (Borujerd County) Population
Administrative Divisions	2006	2011	2016
Darreh Seydi RD	5,066	4,221	3,279
Hemmatabad RD	23,249	29,007	27,016
Shirvan RD (Note: Transferred to Shirvan District and renamed Shirvan-e Sharqi Rural District)	21,710	22,948	21,662
Valanjerd RD	7,607	7,323	6,510
Borujerd (city)	227,547	240,654	234,997
Total	285,179	304,153	293,464
RD = Rural District
