= August 8 =

August 8 this year in various calendars
- Saturday, 8 August 2026
Akan	Monomemene
Armenian	19 Nawasardi 1476
Aztec	Pānquetzaliztli 10, 3 Tecpatl
Babylonian	24 Du'uzu, 2337 SE
Balinese pawukon	Menga, Kajeng, Menala, Paing, Maulu, Saniscara of Merakih, Yama, Erangan, Dewa
Bengali	24 Shrabon, BS 1433
Chinese	Yang Wood Tiger・Stomach Mansion; Fire Horse Year, Month 6, Day 26 (Liqiu, 15 days until Chushu)
Common Era	8 August 2026 CE
Coptic	2 Mesori, AM 1742
Egyptian	24 Choiak, 2775 NE
Ethiopian	2 Naḥasē, 2018 Amätä Məhrät
French Republican	Décade III, Primidi de Thermidor de l'Année 234 de la République
Gregorian	8 August, AD 2026
Hebrew	25 Av, AM 5786
Hindu	Rohiṇi・Dhruva; Solar: 23 Śrāvaṇa, 1948 SE; Lunisolar: Daśamī, Kṛishna pakṣa of Āṣāḍha, 2083 VE; Rāudra・5127 KY・1,872,795
Icelandic	Laugardagur, 14 Heyannir 2026
Islamic	23 Safar, AH 1448 (using tabular method)
ISO week date	2026-W32-6
Japanese	26 Minazuki, Reiwa 8 (Risshū, 15 days until Shosho)
Julian	26 July, AD 2026 (AM 7534)
Julian day	2461261
Korean	26 Yangdal, 4359 DE
Maya	13.0.13.14.18; 11 Yaxkin, 3 Etznab
Roman	ante diem VII Kalendas Augustas, MMDCCLXXIX AUC
Solar Hijri	17 Mordad, SH 1405
Tibetan	25 chu stod, me pho rta 2153 or 1772 or 1000

<<	August					>>
Su	Mo	Tu	We	Th	Fr	Sa
						1
2	3	4	5	6	7	8
9	10	11	12	13	14	15
16	17	18	19	20	21	22
23	24	25	26	27	28	29
30	31
2026

August 8 in recent years
2026 (Saturday)
2025 (Friday)
2024 (Thursday)
2023 (Tuesday)
2022 (Monday)
2021 (Sunday)
2020 (Saturday)
2019 (Thursday)
2018 (Wednesday)
2017 (Tuesday)

August 8 is the 220th day of the year (221st in leap years) in the Gregorian calendar; 145 days remain until the end of the year.

== Events ==
=== Pre-1600 ===
- 685 BC – Spring and Autumn period: Battle of Qianshi: Upon the death of the previous Duke of Qi, Gongsun Wuzhi, Duke Zhuang of Lu sends an army into the Duchy of Qi to install the exiled Qi prince Gongzi Jiu as the new Duke of Qi – but is defeated at Qianshi by Jiu's brother and rival claimant, the newly inaugurated Duke Huan of Qi.
- 870 – Treaty of Meerssen: King Louis the German and his half-brother Charles the Bald partition the Middle Frankish Kingdom into two larger east and west divisions.
- 1164 – Hassan II of Alamut proclaims the qiyāma, according to which Ismaili practice would change from traditional Islamic practice.
- 1220 – Sweden is defeated by Estonian tribes in the Battle of Lihula.
- 1264 – Mudéjar revolt: Muslim rebel forces take the Alcázar of Jerez de la Frontera after defeating the Castilian garrison.
- 1503 – King James IV of Scotland marries Margaret Tudor, daughter of King Henry VII of England, at Holyrood Abbey in Edinburgh, Scotland.
- 1509 – Krishnadeva Raya is crowned Emperor of Vijayanagara at Chittoor.
- 1576 – The cornerstone for Tycho Brahe's Uraniborg observatory is laid on the island of Hven.
- 1585 – John Davis enters Cumberland Sound in search of the Northwest Passage.
- 1588 – Anglo-Spanish War: Battle of Gravelines: The naval engagement ends, ending the Spanish Armada's attempt to invade England.

=== 1601–1900 ===
- 1647 – The Irish Confederate Wars and Wars of the Three Kingdoms: Battle of Dungan's Hill: English Parliamentary forces defeat Irish forces.
- 1648 – Mehmed IV (1648–1687) succeeds Ibrahim I (1640–1648) as Ottoman sultan.
- 1709 – Bartolomeu de Gusmão demonstrates the lifting power of hot air in an audience before the king of Portugal in Lisbon, Portugal.
- 1786 – Mont Blanc on the French-Italian border is climbed for the first time by Jacques Balmat and Dr. Michel-Gabriel Paccard.
- 1794 – Joseph Whidbey leads an expedition to search for the Northwest Passage near Juneau, Alaska.
- 1831 – Four hundred Shawnee people agree to relinquish their lands in Ohio in exchange for land west of the Mississippi River in the Treaty of Wapakoneta.
- 1844 – The Quorum of the Twelve Apostles, headed by Brigham Young, is reaffirmed as the leading body of the Church of Jesus Christ of Latter-day Saints (LDS Church).
- 1863 – American Civil War: Following his defeat in the Battle of Gettysburg, General Robert E. Lee sends a letter of resignation to Confederate President Jefferson Davis (which is refused upon receipt).
- 1863 – Tennessee Military Governor Andrew Johnson frees his personal slaves in Greeneville, Tennessee, despite them being exempt from the Emancipation Proclamation, now commemorated as Emancipation Day in the state.
- 1870 – The Republic of Ploiești, a failed Radical-Liberal rising against Domnitor Carol of Romania.
- 1876 – Thomas Edison receives a patent for his mimeograph.
- 1897 – Italian anarchist Michele Angiolillo assassinates Spanish Prime Minister Antonio Cánovas del Castillo.

=== 1901–present ===
- 1903 – Black Saturday occurs, killing 12 in a stadium collapse in Philadelphia.
- 1908 – Wilbur Wright makes the Wright Brothers' first public flight, at a racecourse at Le Mans, France.
- 1918 – World War I: The Battle of Amiens begins a string of almost continuous Allied victories with a push through the German front lines (Hundred Days Offensive).
- 1919 – The Anglo-Afghan Treaty of 1919 is signed. It establishes peaceful relations between Afghanistan and the UK, and confirms the Durand line as the mutual border. In return, the UK is no longer obligated to subsidize the Afghan government.
- 1929 – The German airship Graf Zeppelin begins a round-the-world flight.
- 1940 – The "Aufbau Ost" directive for the mobilization of German forces for the invasion of the Soviet Union is signed by Wilhelm Keitel.
- 1942 – Quit India Movement is launched in India against the British rule in response to Mohandas Gandhi's call for swaraj or complete independence.
- 1945 – The London Charter is signed by France, the United Kingdom, the Soviet Union and the United States, establishing the laws and procedures for the Nuremberg trials.
- 1945 – World War II: The Soviet Union declares war on Japan.
- 1946 – First flight of the nuclear capable Convair B-36, heaviest mass-produced piston-engined aircraft at the time.
- 1956 – Marcinelle mining disaster in Belgium. 262 coal miners, including a substantial number of Italian migrant workers, are killed in one of the largest mining accidents in Belgian history.
- 1963 – Great Train Robbery: In England, a gang of 15 train robbers steal £2.6 million in bank notes.
- 1963 – The Zimbabwe African National Union (ZANU), the current ruling party of Zimbabwe, is formed by a split from the Zimbabwe African People's Union.
- 1967 – The Association of Southeast Asian Nations (ASEAN) is founded by Indonesia, Malaysia, the Philippines, Singapore and Thailand.
- 1969 – At a zebra crossing in London, photographer Iain Macmillan takes the iconic photo that becomes the cover image of the Beatles' album Abbey Road.
- 1973 – Kim Dae-jung, a South Korean politician and later president of South Korea, is kidnapped.
- 1974 – President Richard Nixon, in a nationwide television address, announces his resignation from the office of the President of the United States effective noon the next day.
- 1988 – The 8888 Uprising begins in Rangoon (Yangon), Burma (Myanmar). Led by students, hundreds of thousands join in nationwide protests against the one-party regime. On September 18, the demonstrations end in a military crackdown, killing thousands.
- 1988 – The first night baseball game in the history of Chicago's Wrigley Field (game was rained out in the fourth inning).
- 1989 – Space Shuttle program: STS-28 Mission: Space Shuttle Columbia takes off on a secret five-day military mission.
- 1990 – Iraq occupies Kuwait and the state is annexed to Iraq. This would lead to the Gulf War shortly afterward.
- 1991 – The Warsaw radio mast, then the tallest construction ever built, collapses.
- 1993 – The 7.8 M_{w} Guam earthquake shakes the island with a maximum Mercalli intensity of IX (Violent), causing around $250 million in damage and injuring up to 71 people.
- 1998 – The Iranian consulate in Mazar-i-Sharif, Afghanistan, is raided by Taliban, leading to the deaths of ten Iranian diplomats and a journalist.
- 2000 – Confederate submarine H.L. Hunley is raised to the surface after 136 years on the ocean floor and 30 years after its discovery by undersea explorer E. Lee Spence.
- 2001 – Albanian rebels ambush a convoy of the Army of the Republic of Macedonia near Tetovo, killing 10 soldiers.
- 2004 – A tour bus belonging to the Dave Matthews Band dumps approximately 800 pounds of human waste onto a boat full of passengers.
- 2007 – An EF2 tornado touches down in Kings County and Richmond County, New York, the most powerful tornado in New York to date and the first in Brooklyn since 1889.
- 2007 – Space Shuttle program: STS-118 Mission: Endeavour takes off on a mission to the International Space Station.
- 2008 – A EuroCity express train en route from Kraków, Poland to Prague, Czech Republic strikes a part of a motorway bridge that had fallen onto the railroad track near Studénka railway station in the Czech Republic and derails, killing eight people and injuring 64 others.
- 2008 – The 29th modern summer Olympic Games take place in Beijing, China until August 24.
- 2009 – A Eurocopter AS350 Écureuil and Piper PA-32R collide over the Hudson River, killing nine people.
- 2010 – China Floods: A mudslide in Zhugqu County, Gansu, China, kills more than 1,400 people.
- 2013 – A suicide bombing at a funeral in the Pakistani city of Quetta kills at least 31 people.
- 2015 – Eight people are killed in a shooting in Harris County, Texas.
- 2016 – Terrorists attack a government hospital in Quetta, Pakistan with a suicide blast and shooting, killing between 70 and 94 people, and injuring around 130 others.
- 2019 – An explosion at the State Central Navy Testing Range in Nyonoksa, Russia, kills five people.
- 2022 – The Federal Bureau of Investigation (FBI) executes a search warrant at former president Donald Trump's residence in Mar-a-Lago, Palm Beach, Florida.
- 2023 – Hawaii wildfires: Seventeen thousand acres of land are burned and at least 101 people are killed, with two others missing, when a series of wildfires break out on the island of Maui in Hawaii.
- 2024 – Nobel laureate Muhammad Yunus takes oath as Chief Adviser to form an interim government in Bangladesh.

== Births ==
=== Pre-1600 ===
- 422 – Casper, ruler of the Maya city of Palenque
- 1079 – Emperor Horikawa of Japan (died 1107)
- 1170 – Saint Dominic, founder of the Dominicans (died 1221)
- 1306 – Rudolf II, Duke of Bavaria (died 1353)
- 1492 – Matteo Tafuri, Italian alchemist (died 1582)
- 1518 – Conrad Lycosthenes, French-German scholar and author (died 1561)
- 1558 – George Clifford, 3rd Earl of Cumberland, English noble (died 1605)

=== 1601–1900 ===
- 1605 – Cecil Calvert, 2nd Baron Baltimore, English lawyer and politician, Governor of Newfoundland (died 1675)
- 1640 – Amalia Catharina, German poet and composer (died 1697)
- 1646 – Godfrey Kneller, German-English painter (died 1723)
- 1673 – John Ker, Scottish spy (died 1726)
- 1693 – Laurent Belissen, French composer (died 1762)
- 1694 – Francis Hutcheson, Irish philosopher and academic (died 1746)
- 1706 – Johan Augustin Mannerheim, Swedish nobleman and military leader (died 1778)
- 1709 – Hermann Anton Gelinek, German-Italian monk and violinist (died 1779)
- 1720 – Carl Fredrik Pechlin, Swedish general and politician (died 1796)
- 1754 – Hipólito Ruiz López, Spanish botanist (died 1816)
- 1758 – Friedrich Georg Weitsch, German painter (died 1828)
- 1790 – Ferenc Kölcsey, Hungarian poet, critic, and politician (died 1838)
- 1807 – Emilie Flygare-Carlén, Swedish author (died 1892)
- 1814 – Esther Hobart Morris, American suffragette and judge (died 1902)
- 1822 – George Stoneman, Jr., United States Army cavalry officer (died 1894)
- 1839 – Nelson A. Miles, American general (died 1925)
- 1851 – George Turner, Australian politician, 18th Premier of Victoria (died 1916)
- 1856 – Thomas Anstey Guthrie, English journalist and author (died 1934)
- 1857 – Cécile Chaminade, French pianist and composer (died 1944)
- 1861 – William Bateson, English biologist (originator of term "genetics") (died 1926)
- 1863 – Jean Leon Gerome Ferris, American painter (died 1930)
- 1866 – Matthew Henson, American explorer (died 1955)
- 1874 – Albert Stanley, 1st Baron Ashfield, English businessman and politician, President of the Board of Trade (died 1948)
- 1875 – Artur Bernardes, Brazilian lawyer and politician, 12th President of Brazil (died 1955)
- 1876 – Varghese Payyappilly Palakkappilly, Indian-Syrian priest, founded the Sisters of the Destitute (died 1929)
- 1879 – Bob Smith, American physician and surgeon, co-founded Alcoholics Anonymous (died 1950)
- 1879 – Emiliano Zapata, Mexican general and politician (died 1919)
- 1880 – Earle Page, Australian lawyer, academic, and politician, 11th Prime Minister of Australia (died 1961)
- 1881 – Paul Ludwig Ewald von Kleist, German field marshal (died 1954)
- 1882 – Ladislas Starevich, Russian-French animator, screenwriter, and cinematographer (died 1965)
- 1884 – Sara Teasdale, American poet and educator (died 1933)
- 1889 – Hans Egede Budtz, Danish actor (died 1968)
- 1889 – Jack Ryder, Australian cricketer (died 1977)
- 1891 – Adolf Busch, German violinist and composer (died 1952)
- 1896 – Marjorie Kinnan Rawlings, American author and academic (died 1953)
- 1898 – Marguerite Bise, French chef (died 1965)

=== 1901–present ===
- 1901 – Ernest Lawrence, American physicist and academic, Nobel Prize laureate (died 1958)
- 1902 – Paul Dirac, English-American physicist and academic, Nobel Prize laureate (died 1984)
- 1904 – Achille Varzi, Italian racing driver (died 1948)
- 1905 – André Jolivet, French composer (died 1974)
- 1907 – Benny Carter, American saxophonist, trumpet player, and composer (died 2003)
- 1907 – Jimmy Steele (Irish republican), lifelong militant and editor (died 1970)
- 1908 – Arthur Goldberg, American jurist and politician, 6th United States Ambassador to the United Nations (died 1990)
- 1909 – Charles Lyttelton, 10th Viscount Cobham, English cricketer and politician, 9th Governor-General of New Zealand (died 1977)
- 1909 – Jack Renshaw, Australian politician, 31st Premier of New South Wales (died 1987)
- 1909 – Bill Voce, England cricketer and coach (died 1984)
- 1910 – Lucky Millinder, American swing and rhythm-and-blues bandleader (died 1966)
- 1910 – Jimmy Murphy, Welsh-English footballer and manager (died 1989)
- 1910 – Sylvia Sidney, American actress (died 1999)
- 1911 – Rosetta LeNoire, American actress (died 2002)
- 1915 – James Elliott, American runner and coach (died 1981)
- 1919 – Dino De Laurentiis, Italian actor and producer (died 2010)
- 1919 – John David Wilson, English animator and producer (died 2013)
- 1920 – Leo Chiosso, Italian songwriter and producer (died 2006)
- 1920 – Jimmy Witherspoon, American jump blues singer (died 1997)
- 1921 – William Asher, American director, producer, and screenwriter (died 2012)
- 1921 – Webb Pierce, American singer-songwriter and guitarist (died 1991)
- 1921 – Esther Williams, American swimmer and actress (died 2013)
- 1922 – Rory Calhoun, American actor (died 1999)
- 1922 – Rudi Gernreich, Austrian-American fashion designer, created the Monokini (died 1985)
- 1922 – Gertrude Himmelfarb, American historian, author, and academic (died 2019)
- 1922 – Károly Reich, Hungarian illustrator (died 1988)
- 1925 – Alija Izetbegović, Bosnian lawyer and politician, 1st President of Bosnia and Herzegovina (died 2003)
- 1925 – Aziz Sattar, Malaysian actor, comedian, singer and director (died 2014)
- 1926 – Richard Anderson, American actor and producer (died 2017)
- 1927 – Johnny Temple, American baseball player and coach (died 1994)
- 1927 – Maia Wojciechowska, Polish-American author (died 2002)
- 1928 – Don Burrows, Australian saxophonist, clarinet player, and flute player (died 2020)
- 1929 – Larisa Bogoraz, Russian linguist and activist (died 2004)
- 1929 – Luis García Meza Tejada, Bolivian general and politician, 68th President of Bolivia (died 2018)
- 1929 – Ronnie Biggs, English criminal (died 2013)
- 1930 – Terry Nation, Welsh-American author and screenwriter (died 1997)
- 1930 – Jerry Tarkanian, American basketball player and coach (died 2015)
- 1931 – Roger Penrose, English physicist, mathematician, and philosopher, Nobel Prize laureate
- 1932 – Mel Tillis, American singer-songwriter and guitarist (died 2017)
- 1933 – Joe Tex, American soul singer-songwriter (died 1982)
- 1934 – Sarat Pujari, Indian actor, director, and screenwriter (died 2014)
- 1935 – Donald P. Bellisario, American director, producer, and screenwriter
- 1935 – John Laws, Papua New Guinean-born Australian singer and radio host (died 2025)
- 1936 – Frank Howard, American baseball player and manager (died 2023)
- 1936 – Jan Pieńkowski, Polish-English author and illustrator (died 2022)
- 1937 – Dustin Hoffman, American actor and director
- 1937 – Sheila Varian, American horse breeder (died 2016)
- 1937 – Cornelis Vreeswijk, Dutch-Swedish singer-songwriter, guitarist, and actor (died 1987)
- 1938 – Jack Baldwin, English chemist and academic (died 2020)
- 1938 – Jacques Hétu, Canadian composer and educator (died 2010)
- 1938 – Connie Stevens, American actress and businesswoman
- 1939 – Jana Andrsová, Czech actress and ballerina (died 2023)
- 1939 – Viorica Viscopoleanu, Romanian long jumper
- 1939 – Alexander Watson, American diplomat, United States Ambassador to Peru
- 1940 – Dilip Sardesai, Indian cricketer (died 2007)
- 1940 – Dennis Tito, American engineer and businessman, founded Wilshire Associates
- 1942 – James Blanchard, American diplomat and politician, 45th Governor of Michigan
- 1942 – Dennis Canavan, Scottish educator and politician
- 1942 – John Gustafson, English singer-songwriter and bass player (died 2014)
- 1942 – Vardo Rumessen, Estonian pianist and musicologist (died 2015)
- 1944 – John C. Holmes, American film actor (died 1988)
- 1944 – Michael Johnson, American singer-songwriter, guitarist, and producer (died 2017)
- 1944 – John Renbourn, English-Scottish guitarist and songwriter (died 2015)
- 1944 – Simon Taylor, English journalist and author
- 1946 – Joe Bethancourt, American singer-songwriter (died 2014)
- 1947 – Ken Dryden, Canadian ice hockey player, lawyer, and politician (died 2025)
- 1947 – Larry Wilcox, American actor, director, and producer
- 1948 – Svetlana Savitskaya, Russian engineer and astronaut
- 1948 – Margaret Urban Walker, American philosopher
- 1948 – Wincey Willis, British broadcaster (died 2024)
- 1949 – Terry Burnham, American actress (died 2013)
- 1949 – Keith Carradine, American actor
- 1949 – Ricardo Londoño, Colombian racing driver (died 2009)
- 1950 – Willie Hall, American drummer and producer
- 1950 – Ken Kutaragi, Japanese businessman, created PlayStation
- 1951 – Martin Brest, American director, producer, and screenwriter
- 1951 – Phil Carlson, Australian cricketer (died 2022)
- 1951 – Mohamed Morsi, Egyptian engineer, academic, and politician, 5th President of Egypt (died 2019)
- 1951 – Mamoru Oshii, Japanese director, producer, and screenwriter
- 1951 – Randy Shilts, American journalist and author (died 1994)
- 1951 – Louis van Gaal, Dutch footballer and manager
- 1952 – Anton Fig, South African-American drummer
- 1952 – Jostein Gaarder, Norwegian author
- 1952 – Doug Melvin, Canadian baseball player and manager
- 1952 – Robin Quivers, American nurse, radio host/personality, and author
- 1952 – Sudhakar Rao, Indian cricketer
- 1953 – Lloyd Austin, American general, 1st black Secretary of Defense
- 1953 – Nigel Mansell, English racing driver
- 1953 – Don Most, American actor and singer
- 1954 – Nick Holtam, English bishop
- 1955 – Diddú, Icelandic singer-songwriter
- 1955 – Herbert Prohaska, Austrian footballer and manager
- 1955 – Michael Roe, Irish racing driver
- 1956 – Chris Foreman, English singer-songwriter and guitarist
- 1956 – David Grant, English singer
- 1956 – Cecilia Roth, Argentinian actress
- 1957 – Dennis Drew, American keyboard player
- 1958 – Deborah Norville, American journalist and game show host
- 1959 – Caroline Ansink, Dutch flute player, composer, and educator
- 1960 – Mustafa Balbay, Turkish journalist and politician
- 1960 – Ulrich Maly, German politician, 16th Mayor of Nuremberg
- 1961 – The Edge, British-Irish musician, singer and songwriter
- 1961 – Daniel House, American bass player and producer
- 1961 – Ron Klain, American lawyer and politician, White House Chief of Staff
- 1961 – Bruce Matthews, American football player and coach
- 1961 – Rikki Rockett, American glam rock drummer
- 1962 – Kool Moe Dee, American musician, singer and actor
- 1963 – Hur Jin-ho, South Korean director and screenwriter
- 1963 – Ron Karkovice, American baseball player and manager
- 1963 – Emi Shinohara, Japanese voice actress and singer (died 2024)
- 1963 – Rika Fukami, Japanese voice actress and singer
- 1963 – Jon Turteltaub, American director and producer
- 1963 – Stephen Walkom, Canadian ice hockey player, referee, and manager
- 1964 – Giuseppe Conte, Prime Minister of Italy
- 1964 – Scott Sandelin, American ice hockey player and coach
- 1964 – Paul Taylor, English cricketer
- 1965 – Angus Fraser, English cricketer, manager, and journalist
- 1965 – Kate Langbroek, Australian talk show host
- 1966 – Chris Eubank, English boxer
- 1966 – John Hudek, American baseball player and coach
- 1966 – Jimmy Wales, American-British entrepreneur, co-founder of Wikipedia
- 1967 – Marcelo Balboa, American soccer player, coach, and sportscaster
- 1967 – Yūki Amami, Japanese theater and film actress
- 1968 – Yvie Burnett, Scottish soprano
- 1968 – Aldo Calderón van Dyke, Honduran journalist (died 2013)
- 1968 – Abey Kuruvilla, Indian cricketer and coach
- 1968 – Huey Morgan, American singer-songwriter and guitarist
- 1969 – Monika Tsõganova, Estonian chess player
- 1969 – Faye Wong, Chinese singer-songwriter and actress
- 1970 – Trev Alberts, American football player and journalist
- 1970 – Ben G. Davis, English chemist and academic
- 1970 – José Francisco Molina, Spanish footballer and manager
- 1970 – Chester Williams, South African rugby player and coach (died 2019)
- 1971 – Johnny Balentina, Dutch baseball player
- 1972 – Joely Collins, Canadian actress and producer
- 1972 – Andrea de Rossi, Italian rugby player and coach
- 1972 – Axel Merckx, Belgian cyclist
- 1972 – Steven Tweed, Scottish footballer and manager
- 1972 – Liina Vahtrik, Estonian actress
- 1973 – Shane Lee, Australian cricketer and guitarist
- 1973 – Gert Olesk, Estonian footballer and manager
- 1973 – Scott Stapp, American singer-songwriter and producer
- 1973 – Mark Wills, American singer-songwriter
- 1973 – Ilka Agricola, German mathematician
- 1974 – Manjul Bhargava, Canadian-American mathematician and academic
- 1974 – Scott D'Amore, Canadian wrestler and manager
- 1974 – Brian Harvey, English singer-songwriter
- 1974 – Andy Priaulx, Guernseyan racing driver
- 1975 – Mick Moss, English singer-songwriter
- 1976 – JC Chasez, American singer and dancer
- 1976 – Drew Lachey, American singer and actor
- 1977 – Lindsay Sloane, American actress
- 1977 – Darren Manzella, American sergeant (died 2013)
- 1977 – Rocky Thompson, Canadian ice hockey player and coach
- 1977 – Nicolas Vogondy, French cyclist
- 1977 – Mohammad Wasim, Pakistani cricketer
- 1978 – Alan Maybury, Irish footballer and coach
- 1978 – Louis Saha, French footballer
- 1978 – Miho Shiraishi, Japanese actress
- 1979 – Richard Harwood, English cellist
- 1979 – Rashard Lewis, American basketball player
- 1979 – Richard Lyons, Northern Irish racing driver
- 1980 – Shayna Baszler, American mixed martial artist and wrestler
- 1980 – Craig Breslow, American baseball pitcher and executive
- 1980 – Jack Cassel, American baseball player
- 1980 – Denisse Guerrero, Mexican singer-songwriter
- 1980 – Sabine Klaschka, German tennis player
- 1980 – Diego Markwell, Dutch baseball player
- 1980 – Pat Noonan, American soccer player
- 1980 – Michael Urie, American actor, director, and producer
- 1981 – Vanessa Amorosi, Australian singer-songwriter
- 1981 – Roger Federer, Swiss tennis player
- 1981 – Meagan Good, American actress and producer
- 1981 – Harel Skaat, Israeli singer-songwriter
- 1982 – David Florence, English canoe racer
- 1982 – Ross Ohlendorf, American baseball player
- 1983 – Guy Burnet, English actor and producer
- 1983 – Willie Tonga, Australian rugby league player
- 1984 – Kirk Broadfoot, Scottish footballer
- 1984 – Norbert Michelisz, Hungarian racing driver
- 1984 – Martrez Milner, American football player
- 1985 – Toby Flood, English rugby player
- 1985 – Ryan Koolwijk, Dutch footballer
- 1985 – James Morgan, Welsh actor and producer
- 1985 – Brett Ratliff, American football player
- 1985 – Anita Włodarczyk, Polish track and field athlete
- 1986 – Kateryna Bondarenko, Ukrainian tennis player
- 1986 – Jackie Cruz, Dominican-American actress and singer
- 1986 – Pierre Garçon, American football player
- 1986 – Chris Pressley, American football player
- 1987 – Pierre Boulanger, French actor
- 1987 – Katie Leung, Scottish actress
- 1987 – Tatjana Maria, German tennis player
- 1988 – Princess Beatrice, British royal
- 1988 – Danilo Gallinari, Italian basketball player
- 1988 – Rinku Singh, Indian baseball player and wrestler
- 1988 – Laura Slade Wiggins, American actress and singer
- 1988 – Agata Sobczyk (born 1988), Polish economist and politician
- 1989 – Ken Baumann, American actor and author
- 1989 – Anthony Rizzo, American baseball player
- 1989 – Hannah Miley, English-Scottish swimmer
- 1989 – Prajakta Mali, Indian actress
- 1990 – Vladimír Darida, Czech footballer
- 1990 – Parker Kligerman, American race car driver
- 1990 – Aleksandra Szwed, Polish actress and singer
- 1990 – Kane Williamson, New Zealand cricket captain
- 1991 – Yandy Díaz, Cuban baseball player
- 1991 – Nélson Oliveira, Portuguese footballer
- 1991 – Tyrone Peachey, Australian rugby league player
- 1991 – Joël Matip, Cameroonian footballer
- 1992 – Josip Drmić, Swiss footballer
- 1992 – Casey Cott, American actor
- 1993 – Emilie Mehl, Norwegian politician
- 1994 – Cameron Payne, American basketball player
- 1995 – S.Coups, South Korean rapper and singer
- 1996 – A'ja Wilson, American basketball player
- 1997 – Karim Walid, Egyptian footballer
- 1997 – Panipak Wongpattanakit, Thai taekwondo athlete
- 1998 – Ryan Garcia, American boxer
- 1998 – Shawn Mendes, Canadian singer-songwriter and guitarist
- 1999 – Xiaojun, Chinese singer
- 2000 – Félix Auger-Aliassime, Canadian tennis player
- 2005 – Alysa Liu, American figure skater

== Deaths ==
=== Pre-1600 ===
- 117 – Trajan, Roman emperor (born 53)
- 753 – Hildegar, bishop of Cologne
- 869 – Lothair II, Frankish king (born 835)
- 998 – Sŏ Hŭi, Korean politician and diplomat (born 942)
- 1002 – Almanzor, chief minister and de facto ruler of Córdoba
- 1171 – Henry of Blois, bishop of Winchester (born 1111)
- 1303 – Henry of Castile the Senator, Spanish nobleman (born 1230)
- 1533 – Lucas van Leyden, Dutch artist (born 1494)
- 1555 – Oronce Finé, French mathematician and cartographer (born 1494)
- 1588 – Alonso Sánchez Coello, Spanish painter (born 1532)

=== 1601–1900 ===
- 1604 – Horio Tadauji, Japanese daimyō (born 1578)
- 1616 – Cornelis Ketel, Dutch painter (born 1548)
- 1631 – Konstantinas Sirvydas, Lithuanian priest, lexicographer, and academic (born 1579)
- 1684 – George Booth, 1st Baron Delamer, English politician (born 1622)
- 1724 – Christoph Ludwig Agricola, German painter (born 1665)
- 1747 – Madeleine de Verchères, Canadian raid leader (born 1678)
- 1746 – Francis Hutcheson, Irish philosopher (born 1694)
- 1759 – Carl Heinrich Graun, German tenor and composer (born 1704)
- 1827 – George Canning, English lawyer and politician, Prime Minister of the United Kingdom (born 1770)
- 1828 – Carl Peter Thunberg, Swedish botanist and psychologist (born 1743)
- 1858 – Marie-Claire Heureuse Félicité Bonheur, Haitian Empress (born 1758)
- 1863 – Angus MacAskill, Scottish-Canadian giant (born 1825)
- 1879 – Immanuel Hermann Fichte, German philosopher and academic (born 1797)
- 1887 – Alexander William Doniphan, American colonel, lawyer, and politician (born 1808)
- 1897 – Jacob Burckhardt, Swiss historian and academic (born 1818)
- 1898 – Eugène Boudin, French painter (born 1824)

=== 1901–present ===
- 1902 – James Tissot, French painter and illustrator (born 1836)
- 1902 – John Henry Twachtman, American painter and academic (born 1853)
- 1909 – Mary MacKillop, Australian nun and saint, co-founded the Sisters of St Joseph of the Sacred Heart (born 1842)
- 1911 – William P. Frye, American lawyer and politician (born 1830)
- 1920 – Eduard Birnbaum, Polish-born German cantor (born 1855)
- 1921 – Juhani Aho, Finnish journalist and author (born 1861)
- 1928 – Stjepan Radić, Croatian politician (born 1871)
- 1930 – Launceston Elliot, Scottish wrestler and weightlifter (born 1874)
- 1934 – Wilbert Robinson, American baseball player, coach, and manager (born 1863)
- 1937 – Jimmie Guthrie, Scottish motorcycle racer (born 1897)
- 1940 – Johnny Dodds, American clarinet player and saxophonist (born 1892)
- 1944 – Erwin von Witzleben, German field marshal (born 1881)
- 1944 – Michael Wittmann, German commander (born 1914)
- 1950 – Fergus McMaster, Australian businessman, founded Qantas (born 1879)
- 1959 – Albert Namatjira, Australian painter (born 1902)
- 1965 – Shirley Jackson, American novelist and short story writer (born 1916)
- 1969 – Otmar Freiherr von Verschuer, German biologist and eugenicist (born 1896)
- 1971 – Freddie Spencer Chapman, English lieutenant (born 1907)
- 1973 – Vilhelm Moberg, Swedish historian and author (born 1898)
- 1974 – Elisabeth Abegg, German anti-Nazi resistance fighter (born 1882)
- 1975 – Cannonball Adderley, American saxophonist (born 1928)
- 1979 – Nicholas Monsarrat, English lieutenant and author (born 1910)
- 1980 – Paul Triquet, Canadian general, Victoria Cross recipient (born 1910)
- 1981 – Thomas McElwee, Provisional Irish Republican Army, died on hunger strike (born 1957)
- 1982 – Eric Brandon, English racing driver and businessman (born 1920)
- 1984 – Richard Deacon, American actor (born 1921)
- 1984 – Ellen Raskin, American author and illustrator (born 1928)
- 1985 – Louise Brooks, American actress (born 1906)
- 1987 – Danilo Blanuša, Croatian mathematician and physicist (born 1903)
- 1988 – Félix Leclerc, Canadian singer-songwriter and guitarist (born 1914)
- 1988 – Alan Napier, English actor (born 1903)
- 1991 – James Irwin, American colonel, pilot, and astronaut, eighth man to walk on the moon (born 1930)
- 1992 – Abu al-Qasim al-Khoei, Iranian religious leader and scholar (born 1899)
- 1996 – Nevill Francis Mott, English physicist and academic, Nobel Prize laureate (born 1905)
- 1996 – Jüri Randviir, Estonian chess player and journalist (born 1927)
- 1998 – Mahmoud Saremi, Iranian journalist (born 1968)
- 2003 – Dirk Hoogendam, Dutch-German SS officer and war criminal (born 1922)
- 2003 – Falaba Issa Traoré, Malian director and playwright (born 1930)
- 2004 – Leon Golub, American painter and academic (born 1922)
- 2004 – Fay Wray, Canadian-American actress (born 1907)
- 2005 – Barbara Bel Geddes, American actress (born 1922)
- 2005 – Ahmed Deedat, South African missionary and author (born 1918)
- 2005 – John H. Johnson, American publisher, founded the Johnson Publishing Company (born 1918)
- 2005 – Gene Mauch, American baseball player and manager (born 1925)
- 2005 – Dean Rockwell, American commander, wrestler, and coach (born 1912)
- 2005 – Monica Sjöö, Swedish-English painter (born 1938)
- 2007 – Ma Lik, Chinese journalist and politician (born 1952)
- 2007 – Melville Shavelson, American director, producer, and screenwriter (born 1917)
- 2008 – Orville Moody, American golfer (born 1933)
- 2009 – Daniel Jarque, Spanish footballer (born 1983)
- 2010 – Patricia Neal, American actress (born 1926)
- 2012 – Fay Ajzenberg-Selove, German-American physicist and academic (born 1926)
- 2012 – Ruth Etchells, English poet and academic (born 1931)
- 2012 – Surya Lesmana, Indonesian footballer and manager (born 1944)
- 2012 – Kurt Maetzig, German director and screenwriter (born 1911)
- 2013 – Karen Black, American actress (born 1939)
- 2013 – Johannes Bluyssen, Dutch bishop (born 1926)
- 2013 – Fernando Castro Pacheco, Mexican painter, engraver, and illustrator (born 1918)
- 2013 – Igor Kurnosov, Russian chess player (born 1985)
- 2013 – Regina Resnik, American soprano and actress (born 1922)
- 2014 – Menahem Golan, Israeli director and producer (born 1929)
- 2014 – Charles Keating, English-American actor (born 1941)
- 2014 – Leonardo Legaspi, Filipino archbishop (born 1935)
- 2014 – Peter Sculthorpe, Australian composer and conductor (born 1929)
- 2014 – Red Wilson, American football and baseball player (born 1929)
- 2015 – Sean Price, American rapper (born 1972)
- 2015 – Gus Mortson, Canadian ice hockey player and coach (born 1925)
- 2017 – Glen Campbell, American singer-songwriter, guitarist, and actor (born 1936)
- 2018 – Nicholas Bett, Kenyan track and field athlete (born 1990)
- 2020 – Gabriel Ochoa Uribe, Colombian football player and manager (born 1929)
- 2020 – Alfredo Lim, former Philippine senator and Mayor of Manila (born 1929)
- 2021 – Bill Davis, Canadian politician, 18th premier of Ontario (born 1929)
- 2022 – Olivia Newton-John, English-Australian singer-songwriter and actress (born 1948)
- 2023 – Rodriguez, American singer and songwriter (born 1942)
- 2024 – Issa Hayatou, Cameroonian basketball player and football executive (born 1946)
- 2024 – Mitzi McCall, American actress (born 1930)
- 2024 – Chi-Chi Rodríguez, Puerto Rican professional golfer (born 1935)
- 2024 – Steve Symms, American politician and lobbyist (born 1938)

== Holidays and observances ==
- Ceasefire Day (end of Iran–Iraq War) (Iraqi Kurdistan)
- Christian Feast Day:
  - Altmann of Passau
  - Bonifacia Rodríguez y Castro
  - Cyriacus and companions
  - Dominic de Guzmán, founder of the Dominican Order.
  - Four Crowned Martyrs
  - Blessed Maria Anna Rosa Caiani
  - Mary MacKillop
  - Severus of Vienne
  - August 8 (Eastern Orthodox liturgics)
- Father's Day or Bā bā Day (爸爸節), Bā Bā is Mandarin for "father" and "8-8", or August 8. (Mongolia, Taiwan)
- Happiness Happens Day
- International Cat Day
- Namesday of the Queen (Sweden)
- Nane Nane Day (Tanzania)
- Signal Troops Day (Ukraine)
