= Aldo Calderón van Dyke =

Honduran journalist (died 2013)

- Died: 14 August 2013; Honduras
- Cause of death: Suicide
- Burial place: San Pedro Sula, Honduras
- Occupation: Journalist

Aldo Calderón van Dyke (died 14 August 2013) was a Honduran journalist that worked for Canal 11, La Prensa, and El Tiempo. He committed suicide and died on 14 August 2013 at around ten at night in a Honduran Social Security Institute hospital. He was buried in San Pedro Sula.
