= Károly Reich =

Hungarian illustrator (1922–1988)

Károly Reich (8 August 1922 – 7 September 1988; also written Karoly Reich) was a Hungarian artist best known for his illustrations in children's books and for his distinctive draughtsmanship. His work was widely popular among Hungarian children throughout his 40-year career, during which he illustrated approximately 500 books.

== Life and education ==
Reich was born in Balatonszemes to a farming family. He began drawing at home before attending the Hungarian Academy of Applied Art, where he specialized in fine arts from 1942 to 1944.

== Death ==
He died in Budapest.

== Work ==
Reich drew his early inspiration from the beaches of Lake Balaton, where he first began sketching. His later influences included Greek mythology. He illustrated around 500 books with remarkable intuition and creativity.

His work was exhibited throughout Hungary, as well as internationally in cities including Essen, Lugano, Paris, Tokyo, Sofia, and Belgrade.

Drawings and book illustrations by Reich can be seen at:

- Mesevilág, csodavilág - Reich Károly meseillusztrációi
- Reich Károly grafikái a Reich galériában
- Kék királylány, zöld boszorkány
