= History of Wrigley Field =

History of the baseball stadium in Chicago, Illinois

The history of Wrigley Field, the home of the Chicago Cubs of Major League Baseball's National League, begins well before the Cubs played their first game in that venue.

== Before the Federal League ==
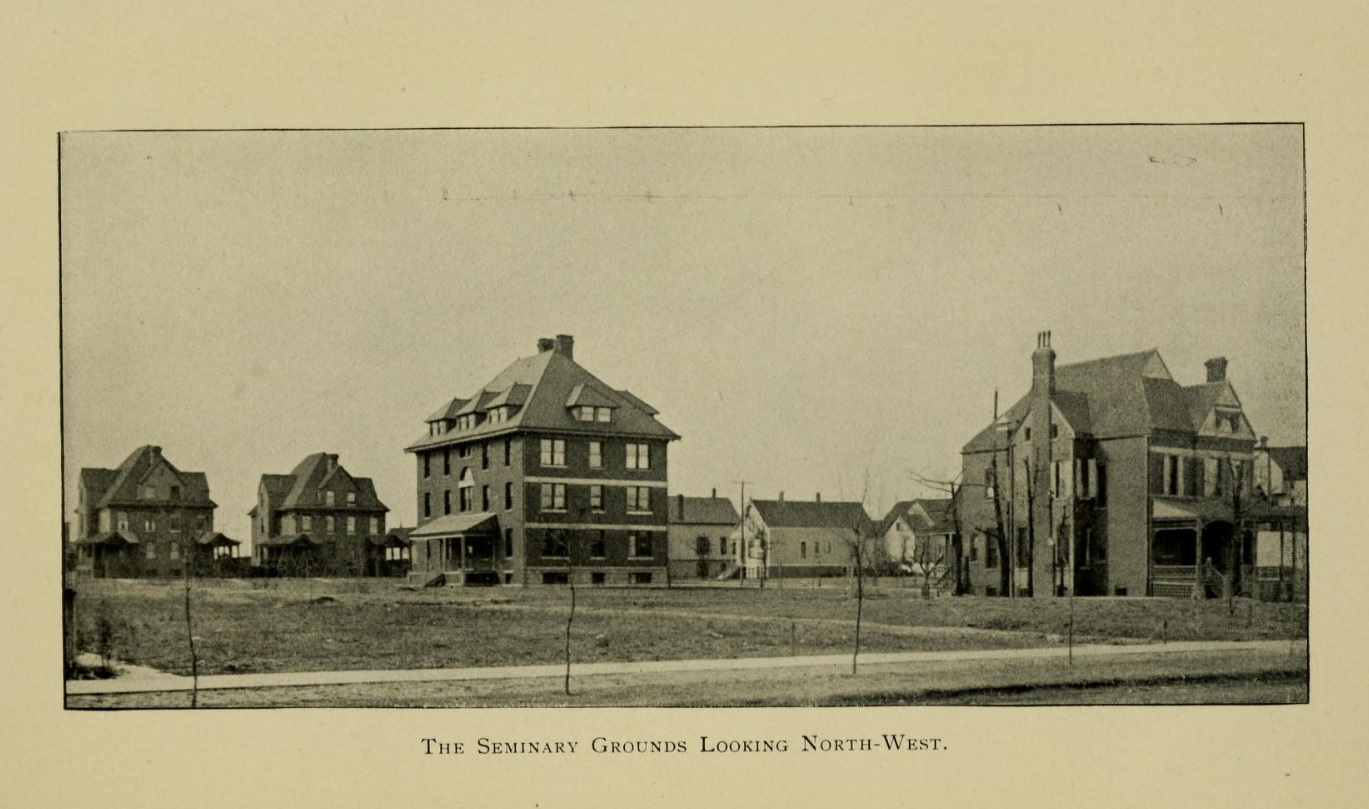
Chicago Lutheran Theological Seminary, seen around 1900, from Sheffield Avenue. The president's house on the right is located near the site of the present-day Wrigley Field scoreboard and center field bleachers. The building in the center, Eliza Hall, is in the present location of the left field bleachers. Off to the left in the background are campus houses for professors, now occupied by the grandstand along the left field line. Note the wooden frame houses across Waveland Avenue as seen between the president's house and Eliza Hall.

At the turn of the 20th century, the block bounded by Clark, Addison, Waveland, and Sheffield streets was home to the Chicago Lutheran Theological Seminary, with the Hildebrandt Coal Factory across the street to the west. William Passavant, a prominent Lutheran missionary, had inherited the land decades before. Passavant began to develop the land as early as 1868, including the construction of St. Mark's Church by 1874. In 1891, Passavant helped establish the Chicago Lutheran Seminary on the site.

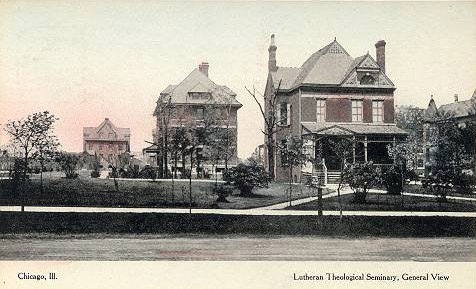
A period postcard featuring a photo taken several years after the photo above, and from a position further north up Sheffield Avenue near its intersection with Waveland Avenue. Note that the far side of Waveland (far right) has been wholly redeveloped with new apartments. These buildings can still be seen across Waveland from Wrigley Field.

At the time the seminary was established, the area was located in a quiet, relatively undeveloped section of the Lake View District of Chicago's North Side. The seminary started small, holding classes in a small chapel facing Addison Street. The following year, the president's house was constructed at the corner of Sheffield and Waveland. In 1893, the seminary spent $25,000 to construct the four-story Eliza Hall housing the library, chapel, lecture and student rooms further to the west along Waveland. By 1899, four homes were built for professors from the northwest corner of the block (at Waveland and Stella) stretching south along Stella. The seminary had ambitious plans for expansion. In 1905, it announced plans to build additional buildings on the southwest corner of the block housing dining halls, a gymnasium, and more lecture and student rooms, along with additional professors' homes on either side of Eliza Hall. The buildings were to be arranged around a central quadrangle.

The seminary, however, was attempting to flourish in the context of a changing community. The extension of the elevated system into the area in 1900 led to rapid development of the surrounding neighborhood. As the area started taking on an increasingly urban character, the seminary abandoned its plans to develop the site and instead sought to sell its land and find a quieter location.

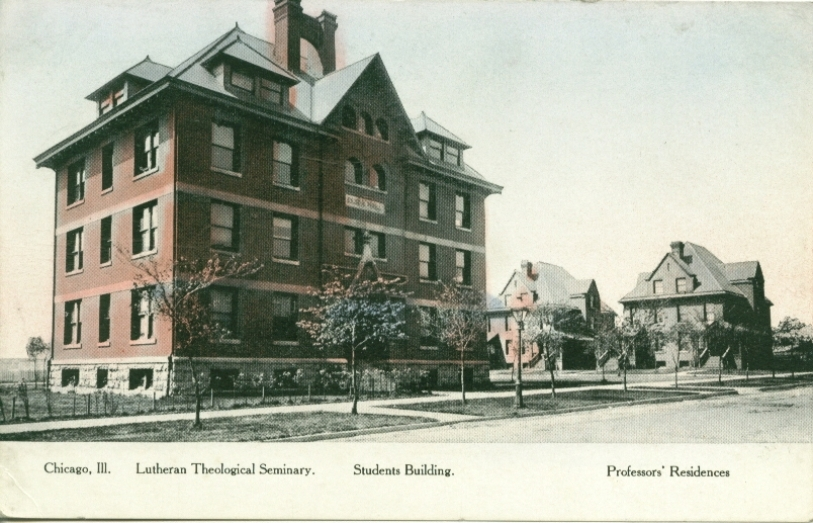
A close-up view of Eliza Hall ("Students Building") and the professors residences from the same series of postcards as seen from Waveland Avenue

Meanwhile, other developments were coming together to chart a very different future for this plot of land. As early as 1905, rumors had been swirling that minor-league American Association was seeking to locate a franchise in Chicago as part of a strategy to achieve major league status on par with the National League and the recently established American League. The Chicago market was one of the most lucrative in the country, and was already occupied by the NL's Cubs and the AL's White Sox. Charles Havenor (owner of the AA Milwaukee Brewers), and brothers Joe Cantillon (manager of the Washington Senators) and Mike Cantillon (owner of the AA Minneapolis Millers), saw an opportunity to make profit by snapping up choice property in the event that the AA decided to move into the Chicago market. Since the White Sox played on the South Side at South Side Park, and the Cubs were firmly ensconced on the West Side at West Side Park, Havenor and the Cantillons looked to the rapidly developing North Side as the best place to situate a team. The seminary's location represented the best open land on the North Side. In 1909, the seminary, eager to move, sold the property to Havenor and the Cantillons for $175,000 and relocated to the suburb of Maywood, Illinois, where it remained until 1967. Havenor and the Cantillons brought in additional investors in 1910, including E.T. Harmon and Edmund Archambault, wealthy Milwaukee businessmen.

The new owners had intended to keep the sale out of the news, but those plans were foiled when members of the seminary board complained that the seminary could have obtained $200,000 in the sale. Havenor was forced to publicly deny any intention on invading the Chicago market. Other AA team owners got cold feet at the prospect of a war with the major leagues, and elected a president that was unwilling to countenance such a scheme. Over the next couple years, Havenor gradually gave up hope of developing the property, selling out his interest to the remaining investors shortly before his death in April 1912. The former seminary site was not developed any further, and the former seminary buildings were converted into residential units.

== Weeghman Park and the Federal League (1913–1915) ==
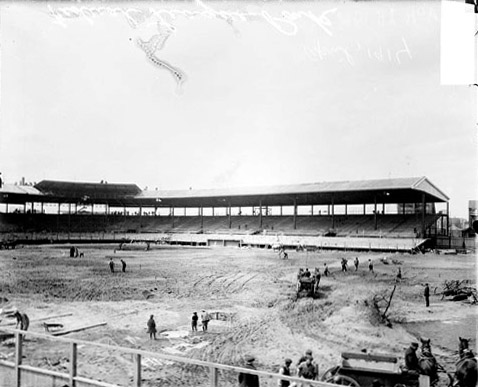
Construction of Weeghman Park, early April 1914

The Federal League began its existence as a minor league in 1913, locating franchises in six cities, including Chicago. The Chicago franchise, known as the Chi-Feds, played its home games at the baseball grounds at DePaul University.

John T. Powers, founder and president of the new Federal League, had ambitions of building the new organization into a premier minor league, on par with the American Association. By the middle of the 1913 season, however, the owners had forced Powers out of his job, sensing that the Federal League had the potential to become a viable major league. Replacing him as president was James A. Gilmore, a wealthy Chicago businessman who had made his fortune in coal. Gilmore had the organizational and political skills necessary to mount a serious challenge to the established major leagues.

Gilmore brought on board two partners to control the key Chicago franchise. One was William Walker, a fish wholesaler. The other was the flamboyant Charles A. Weeghman, known as "Lucky Charlie", who had made a quick fortune in local lunch counters (a predecessor to fast food). Weeghman became the club president and the main force behind the team from that point onward, with Walker willing to remain in the background, and Gilmore tending to League issues. Weeghman made headlines by landing star shortstop Joe Tinker from the Cincinnati Reds in December 1913. The Tinker acquisition was the shot in the arm that gave the franchise the momentum to think big for the upcoming 1914 season.

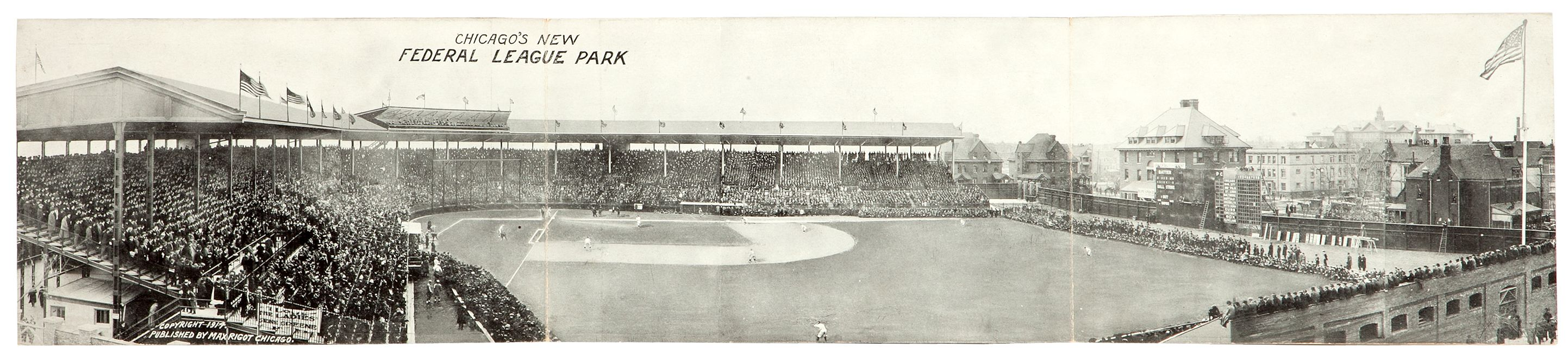
Weeghman Park, home of the Federal League champion Chicago Whales, as seen from Sheffield Avenue, in April 1914. Note the former seminary buildings beyond the fence, the original location of the scoreboard in left field, and the "jury box" bleachers in right-center field. Compare this image with the picture below taken from the same vantage point in 1915.

Weeghman chose to relocate the franchise from DePaul to the former seminary grounds at Clark and Addison owned by Archambault and the Cantillons. Although the major leagues threw up a number of roadblocks, including an attempt to secure rights to part of the land on the block, in late December 1913 Weeghman secured a ninety-nine year lease on the property. The lease stipulated, among other things, that improvements on the property could not exceed $70,000. Within several months, however, Weeghman would spend several times that amount in erecting his new ballpark.

Weeghman hired Zachary Taylor Davis, architect of Comiskey Park (which became the home of the White Sox in June 1910), to design the new ballpark. Weeghman wanted the park to rival the Polo Grounds in New York, but in the end the single-decked grandstand as designed bore little resemblance to it.

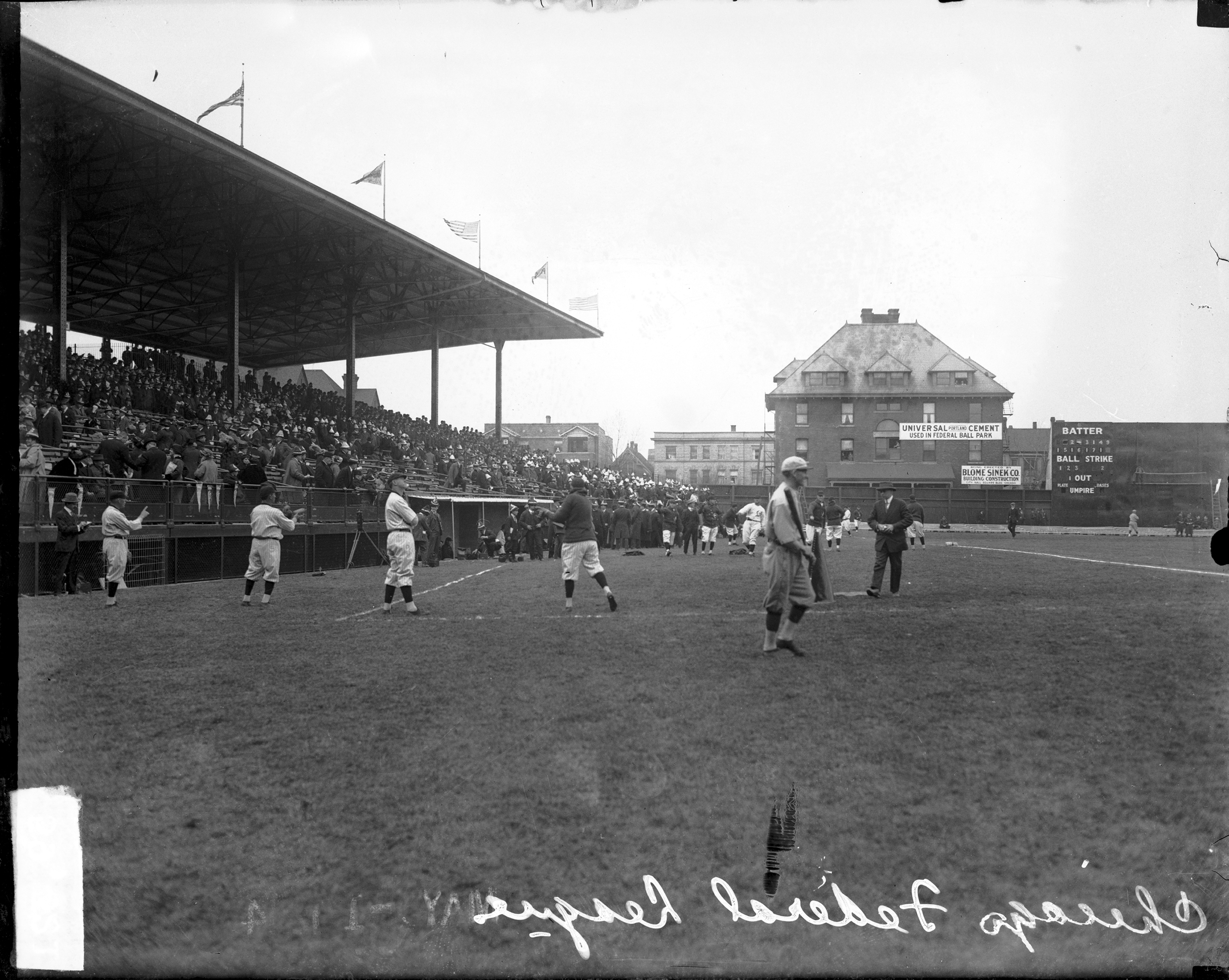
Weeghman Park, April 1914. Note Eliza Hall beyond the left-field fence. Compare this image with the picture below taken from the same vantage point in May 1914.

Work on the property did not begin until February 23, 1914, exactly two months before the Chi-Feds' scheduled home opener. After the grounds had been cleared, groundbreaking ceremonies took place on March 4. Under the guidance of the Blome-Sinek company, the lead construction contractor, the park came together over the remainder of March and the first half of April. Despite a brief strike by construction workers in early April, the new park was ready for baseball by the date of the home opener on April 23, 1914.

The new ballpark, known as Weeghman Park, was a modern steel and concrete baseball plant (in the industrial lexicon of the day). It featured a single-decked grandstand sweeping from right field behind home plate to near the left field corner. Perched on top of the grandstand roof behind home plate was a small area for the press.

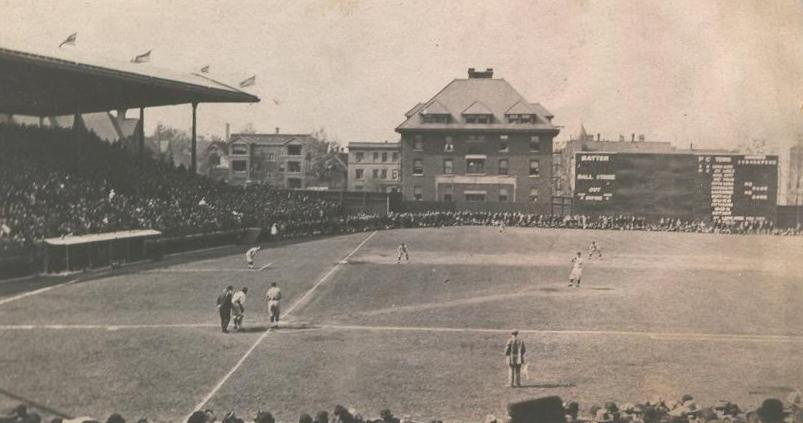
Weeghman Park, May 1914. Note Eliza Hall beyond the left-field fence. During the park's first three games in April 1914, the original fence proved too inviting to batters, leading the team to move it back during the next road trip. Relocating the fence necessitated demolition of a porch on Eliza Hall - note the discoloration where the porch had been attached. That building was demolished altogether shortly before the 1915 season and replaced with bleachers. For comparison, see the above picture taken from the same vantage point in April 1914.

A modern-day visitor to the original Weeghman Park would have difficulty recognizing the outfield aside from the familiar buildings on the opposite side of Waveland and Sheffield Avenues (which have not changed much at all). The dimensions of the original playing field along the foul lines were quite short. The distance from home plate to the right field brick fence along Sheffield Avenue was around 300 feet (90 m) at the foul line. Left field was not much better, partly because several old seminary buildings stood between the wooden left field fence and Waveland Avenue. The left field fence also featured a large scoreboard. Like most of the parks of the day, the field was essentially angular, as it was shaped by the surrounding grid street pattern. The right and left field walls converged in a corner in deep center field, nearly 450 feet (135 m) from home plate. Because of the constricted size of much of the outfield near the corners, bleachers were limited to a small jury box in right-center field. All told, Weeghman Park had a seating capacity of 14,000, but this was frequently exceeded by the many standing room only crowds of the day.

After an unusual number of home runs were hit during the Chi-Feds' first home series against Kansas City in April, Weeghman decided the left field wall was too cozy a target, and had the entire fence moved back some 25 feet. To do this, the front porch had to be removed from the old seminary building beyond the wall.

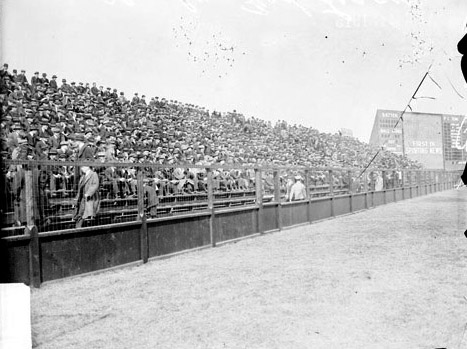
New left field bleachers at Weeghman Park, 1915. Note the scoreboard has now been moved to center field. These bleachers occupied the former site of Eliza Hall.

Before the start of the 1915 season, Weeghman made additional changes to the outfield. Gone were the jury-box bleachers in right-center field. The old seminary buildings beyond left field were finally demolished in March. In their place, Weeghman had wooden bleachers erected from the left-field corner to center field, raising the park's capacity to roughly 18,000. The scoreboard was relocated to center field, where it has remained in one form or another since then (with the exception of the latter part of the 1937 season during construction of the current bleachers).

On the field, the Chi-Feds were renamed the Chicago Whales for their second season. Weeghman Park became a prominent venue for baseball in Chicago as the team won the Federal Legue pennant in a closely contested race. The park was also noted for its high standards of cleanliness and promotion. Weeghman introduced initiatives such as Ladies' Day (every Friday) and in 1916, became the first baseball owner to allow fans to keep foul balls. A successful reataurateur, he also contributed to the park's reputation for quality food. well before the Wrigley family's involvement, the park was already known for its hospitality.

Despite the exciting pennant race and generally high quality of baseball played in the Federal League, the League was hemorrhaging money. In December 1915, the League capitulated to the other major leagues and disbanded. But all was not lost for Weeghman, however. He was allowed to purchase the Cubs franchise for $500,000, and promptly moved his new club out of the dilapidated West Side Park and into his Weeghman Park for the 1916 season. The purchase was in reality a merger between the Whales and the Cubs, as a number of former Whales stars, such as Max Flack and Claude Hendrix, found themselves playing in the same park as Cubs the following season.

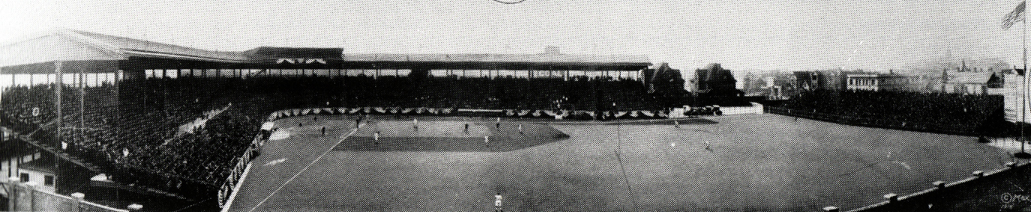
Weeghman Park, home of the Federal League champion Chicago Whales, as seen from Sheffield Avenue, in 1915. With the park now occupying all the land right up to Waveland Avenue, its left field area is substantially larger than it was the previous year, as is apparent from the considerable distance between the end of the left-field grandstand and the left-field corner. For comparison, see the above picture taken from the same vantage point in 1914.

== Weeghman Park to Cubs Park to Wrigley Field (1916–1932) ==
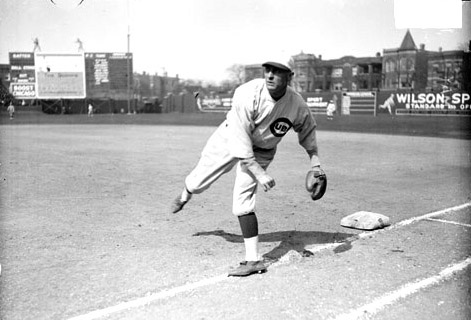
Cubs right fielder Max Flack in front of original short right field wall, c. 1920. Note the Doublemint "elves" atop the scoreboard, and the Wilson Sporting Goods sign on the right field wall.

The Cubs played their first game at Weeghman Park on April 20, 1916, besting the Cincinnati Reds 7–6 in eleven innings. This proved to be the highlight of an otherwise unremarkable season. After another year in the bottom half of the standings, the Cubs won the National League pennant in 1918 under manager Fred Mitchell. The victory was not without a little outside help, as wartime conditions during the height of American involvement in World War I caused major league baseball to end the regular season on September 1. With the Cubs struggling for cash, Weeghman reluctantly rented the larger capacity Comiskey Park for the Cubs' home games in the World Series. For the Cubs, the experience was a bust, as the club lost the series to Babe Ruth and the Boston Red Sox in six games to relatively anemic attendance. Such losses may have provided the final push forcing Charlie Weeghman out of management following the season.

Although Weeghman was clearly the most dominant figure in the revamped Cubs organization in 1916, a number of investors had taken up minority shares in the club. One of the new investors was chewing gum magnate William Wrigley. Over the next couple years, as Weeghman's financial fortunes off the field entered a sharp decline, Wrigley acquired an increasing number of shares in the club and took on a growing role in the team's affairs. In November 1918, Weeghman gave up his remaining interest to Wrigley, resigned as president, and left baseball for good. Wrigley would acquire complete control of the Cubs by 1921.

With Weeghman out of the picture, starting in 1919 the park was generally referred to as Cubs Park. Although the Cubs featured stars such as pitchers Grover Alexander and Hippo Vaughn, along with a young catcher named Gabby Hartnett, over the next few seasons Cubs Park was the setting for largely also-ran teams.

The fans had even more to be frustrated about off the field. Rumors of thrown games plagued the Cubs during the latter part of the 1920 season gave impetus to the criminal investigations which eventually led to uncovering the infamous Black Sox Scandal across town with the White Sox. In addition, 1920 marked the beginning of prohibition, meaning fans would have to find some other way to quench their thirst during the many hot summer afternoons at Cubs Park.

Although the Cubs teams of the early 1920s were little more than also-rans, the fans still flocked to Cubs Park. In 1922, 542,283 fans went through the turnstiles—the second-highest attendance in the National League—to watch a fourth-place club. The first-place New York Giants outdrew them, with 945,809.

=== Major renovations (1922–23) ===
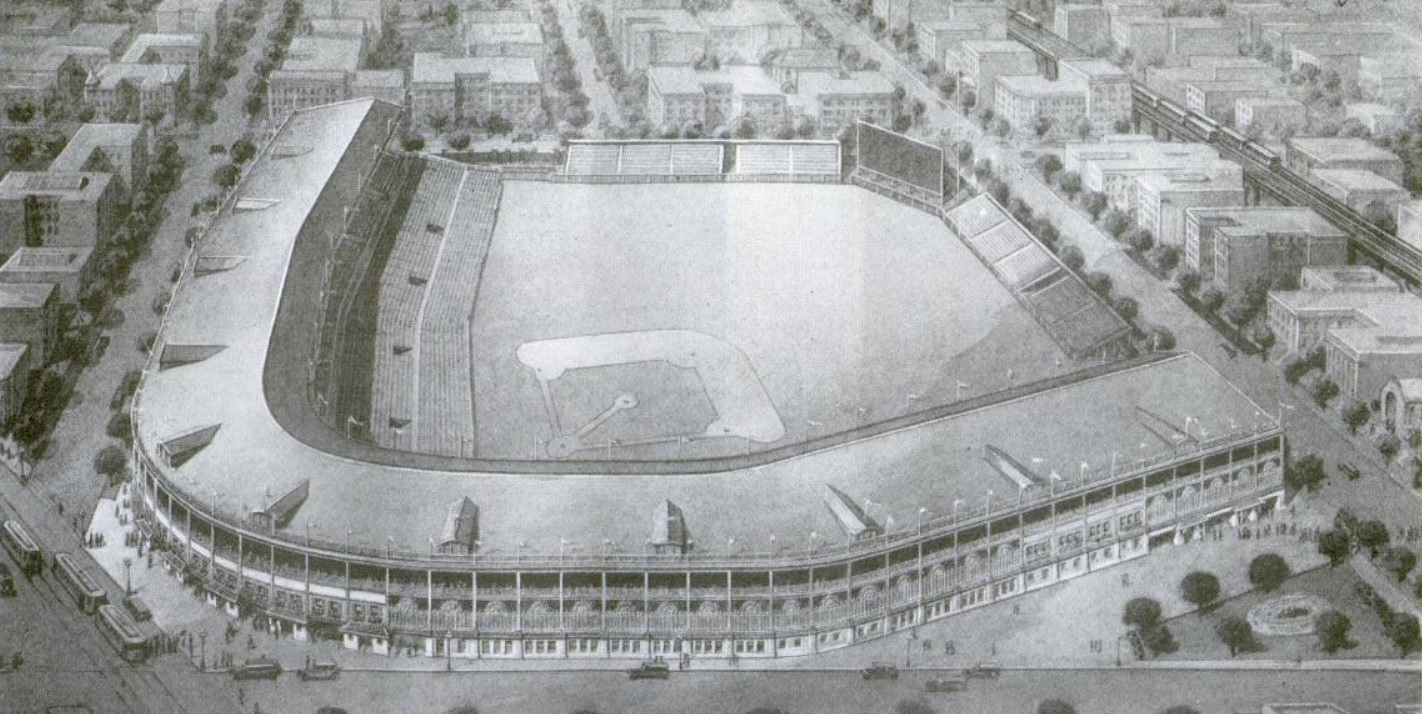
Aerial rendering of the proposed expansion of Cubs Park, circa 1922

By 1922, William Wrigley had decided that after nine seasons, both the seating and the playing field of cozy Cubs Park were ready for a major expansion. Rather than rebuilding the grandstand from scratch, Wrigley hired original architect Zachary Taylor Davis to make the expansion around the existing structure. The grandstand would be sliced into three pieces, with the home plate section placed on rollers and moved roughly 60 feet west (away from right field), and the left field section about 100 feet northwest. Both gaps were to be filled in with more seating, resulting in a significantly longer grandstand and the noticeable "dog leg" shape of the stands on the first base side visible to this day. Additionally, the foul ground and the height of the fence in front of it would be reduced by additional rows of box seats added in front of the existing grandstand. The diamond and the foul lines would be rotated 3 degrees counterclockwise from their earlier orientation, allowing for those extra box seats. Home plate was moved with the center section of the original grandstand; in the current configuration, the original location is in the vicinity of the first base coaches box.

The relocation of the grandstand would make right field far more spacious than before, even with the addition of new bleachers in right field from the corner to the center field scoreboard. The old wooden bleachers in left field were to be dismantled and replaced with newer steel-framed wooden seats like those being installed in right field. The renovations would boost the park's capacity from roughly 18,000 to 31,000. Its dimensions would be roughly 320 feet in left field, 318 in right, and 446 feet to straightaway center.

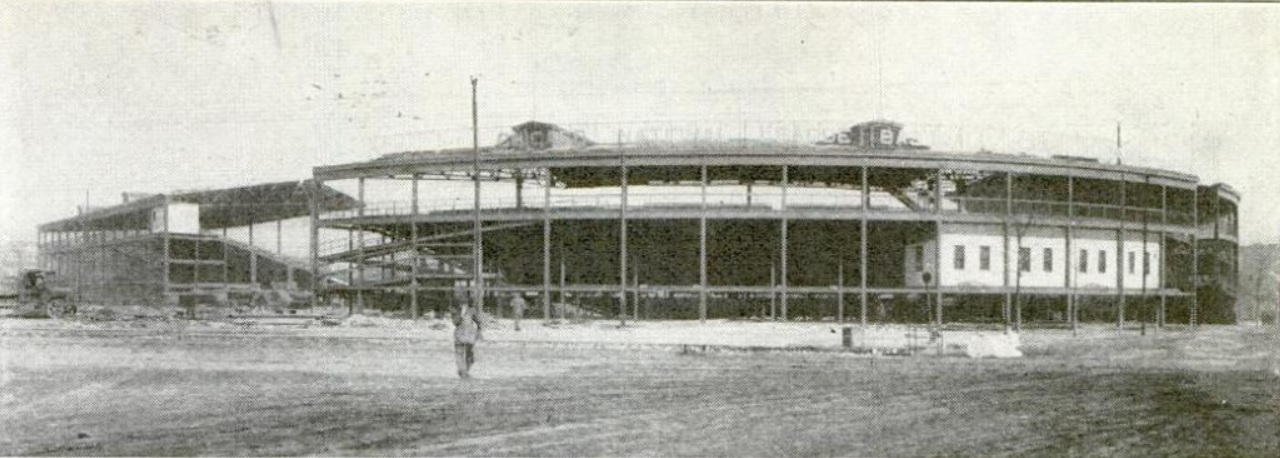
Cubs Park grandstand, seen in January 1923 from the corner of Clark and Addison, divided into three segments during the 1922–23 expansion, prior to the construction of additional sections between the relocated segments. Note that, in the days before the famous marquee was installed, the ballpark was identified by a sign along the top of the grandstand reading "Chicago National League Baseball Club".

Work on the renovations began in early December 1922 and was completed in time for the 1923 season opener. The changes were of such magnitude that many publications of the time referred to the "new" Cubs Park. Fans flocked to the park, and attendance shot up to 703,705 for the 1923 season, although this was once again only good for second-best in the National League as the pennant-winning Giants drew 820,780. On the field, however, the Cubs remained also-rans. The team drifted aimlessly through the middle of the standings in 1923 and 1924. By 1925, the Cubs found themselves commemorating their fiftieth season in the National League by finishing last for the first time (which in 1925 meant eighth place).

An ugly incident occurred at 5:00 A.M. on October 14, 1923. A bomb exploded near an entrance at Addison and Sheffield (the right field corner area), destroying some ticket booths and damaging some nearby buildings. The motive was believed to be labor unrest about the construction team that had been hired to carry out the ballpark expansion.[Chicago Tribune, October 14, 1923, p.1; and October 15, 1923, p.3] Similar incidents had occurred in April. (Landis awards and labor unrest)

Chicago Tribune; Oct. 15, 1923
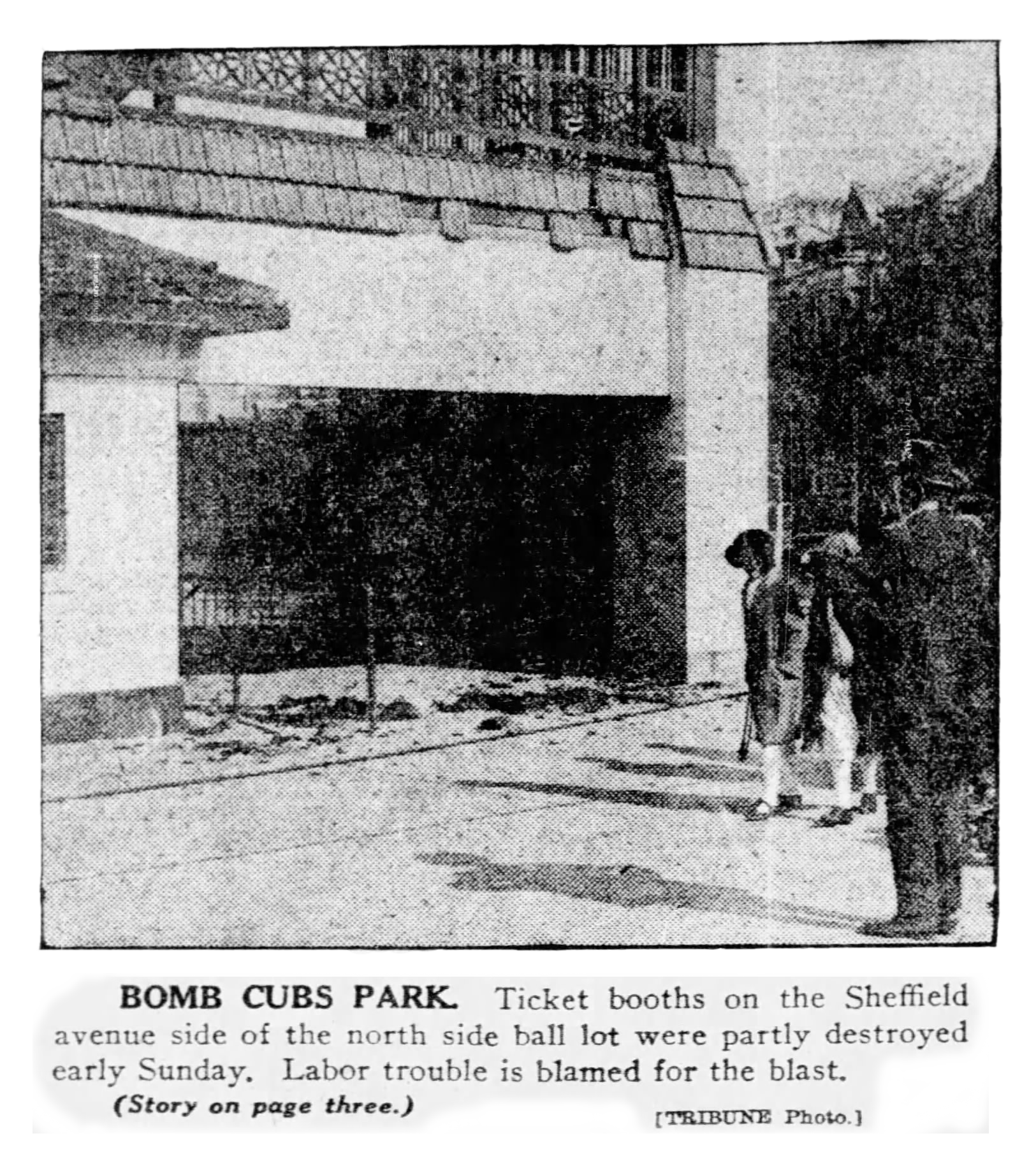

The recently renovated Cubs Park, while a hit with the fans, was not without its critics. Their main objection was that the new left field bleachers were simply too easy a target for right-handed hitters of visiting teams. The Cubs put up with it for 2 1/2 seasons. By late July and early August 1925, reporters were frequently griping about games lost to fly balls which would have been easy outs without the left field bleachers.

The club decided to dismantle the half of the left field bleachers closest to the foul line, leaving just a "jury box" of seats running from deep left-center to the center field scoreboard. The demolition work began on August 5, and with two more home series to be played before the next road trip, the club declared that fly balls into the demolition area would be ground rule doubles. Several were hit there during the next few games. During the road trip, the demolition and re-sodding were completed, and the Cubs returned to their revamped field on September 3.

The change had cost the Cubs over a thousand seats, although that left-field area was sometimes filled with standing-room-only spectators behind ropes, as was the custom of the day. With the left field line now at a substantial 364 feet from home plate in front of a higher outer wall, home run production dropped.

=== Double decking the grandstand (1927–28) ===
By 1926, the Cubs were benefiting handily from the peak of the Roaring Twenties. Nearly 900,000 fans went through the turnstiles at a park with a capacity of just over 30,000. After the close of the season, work began on adding a second deck to the grandstand. The original idea was to have the job completed by the opening of the 1927 season, but by April, only the third-base side of the upper deck had been completed, temporarily giving the park a startlingly asymmetrical appearance.

Cubs Park was formally renamed Wrigley Field prior to the start of the 1927 season.

Despite the half-finished state of the upper deck expansion, the 1927 Cubs drew over 1.1 million fans, becoming the first National League team ever to do so. In addition to the increased capacity of the park, the Cubs helped their own cause by becoming an increasingly competitive team under manager Joe McCarthy.

The upper deck was finally completed in time for the 1928 season, which saw the Cubs break the million mark in attendance yet again. The timing could not have been more fortuitous. In 1929, the Cubs put together one of the most potent lineups in major league history, and easily walked to the National League pennant with stars like Hack Wilson, Rogers Hornsby, Kiki Cuyler, Charlie Root and Pat Malone. Season attendance soared to nearly 1.5 million fans. This would remain the major league record for seventeen years, a record aided in large part by declining major league attendance during the Great Depression and World War II. The Cubs themselves would not top this mark for another forty years.

As the World Series approached, Wrigley sought to provide even more seating at the park. He contracted to have temporary wooden bleachers erected on both Waveland and Sheffield Avenues, raising the park's capacity to roughly 50,000. Both streets were closed to traffic. In the end, the bleachers were only needed for games one and two of the 1929 World Series, both of which the Cubs lost on their way to a five-game defeat at the hands of the underdog Philadelphia Athletics.

By the early 1930s, distance markers were posted: left field line, 364 feet; left-center against the outer wall, 372; left center, corner of bleachers, 364; deep center field corner, 440; right center, 354; right field line, 321.

During the 1968–1970 off-seasons, the concrete in the upper deck was stripped and replaced. After 40 years of harsh Chicago winters, the original concrete was showing signs of wear and tear; it was replaced with precast concrete installed over the 1927 steel framework. In 2004, nearly 40 years later, this precast concrete itself began to show deterioration as several chunks of the precast concrete fell, leading to increased safety inspections and the installation of protective netting.

== "Beautiful Wrigley Field" (1932–1981) ==
=== Construction of the bleachers (1937) ===
Wrigley Field is known for the Boston ivy (Parthenocissus tricuspidata) planted against the outfield wall in 1937 by Bill Veeck, whose father had been team president until his 1933 death. If the ball is hit into and lost in the ivy, then it is ruled a ground-rule double, provided that the defensive outfielder raises his hands to signify that the ball has been lost in the ivy; if the player attempts to search for the ball, the play is considered live, and no ground-rule double is ruled. Wrigley is also known for the manual scoreboard Veeck also erected. No batted ball has ever hit the scoreboard; indeed, very few home runs have even landed in the "upper deck" of the center field bleachers. However, Sam Snead did manage to hit the big board with a golf ball teed off from home plate, on April 17, 1951, just prior to the Cubs home opener.

In 1937, the Cubs announced plans to rebuild the bleachers in concrete instead of wood, to be fronted by brick that would soon be covered in ivy, and to build a new scoreboard. To make the outfield look more symmetrical and graceful, the plans called for extending the left field bleachers to a point closer to the corner. The gentle curves between the ends of the left and right field bleachers would become popularly known as the "wells". That summer, the Chicago Tribune ran a series of articles about major league ballparks, and the writer sharply criticized the Cubs for a remodeling that he suspected would result in too many "cheap" home runs. The writer later retracted when he saw that the final plan was somewhat more spacious than originally announced.

Construction went on behind a temporary fence during the summer, and the finished product was unveiled on September 4, in time for the last month of the season. Bill Veeck's famous ivy was planted not long after, but it would be another year before it fully took hold. According to his own autobiography, Veeck as in Wreck, he planted Bittersweet, which would grow quickly, and also the more famous Boston ivy, which would eventually take over. Another part of the arboretum was to be a series of Chinese elms on the large "stairsteps" up to the scoreboard, as well as one apiece in the little triangle at the top of each "well". According to Veeck's biography, that plan did not fare so well as the winds kept blowing the leaves off. Management finally gave up "after about twenty tries", so the trees are long gone, leaving just the large bare steps and (until 2006) the little flat triangular supports at the tops of the "wells". According to Veeck, the trees themselves were inexpensive, but the special construction for them in the bleachers cost about $200,000.

Wrigley Field seen from above during the 1935 World Series. This was one of three times prior to 2005 that the Cubs erected temporary bleachers over the Waveland and Sheffield sidewalks. The other occasions were the 1929 and 1932 World Series.

Another mistake was constructing bleachers in straightaway center field: The batters could easily lose sight of the ball in the white shirts worn by spectators on sunny days, because the wall was not high enough to provide a full batter's background by itself. Various methods were tried to get around this. At one time a flat canopy was extended over the area, to try to put the spectators in shadow, but that was ineffective (the 2005–2006 reconstruction would to some extent revisit that concept). For a while in the mid-1960s, a screen was attached to the top of the wall and the ivy twined its way up. Batters and bleacher fans disliked it, and it was removed after a couple of seasons. Later, for a number of years, a green tarp covered those seats.

After generally being closed to spectators sometime in the late 1940s or early 1950s, the last time those three problem sections were used for baseball was during the 1962 All-Star game. The seats continued to be used for other events such as football and soccer, during the years when the Chicago Bears and the Chicago Sting played their games here.

By the 1990s, the area was occupied by juniper plants, which nicely complemented the ivy. Also, the layout was tweaked a bit, to open up a few seats on either side of the straight center field area while still providing a rectangular background from the perspective of the batter.

After the 2005 season, the plants were temporarily removed during reconstruction (see below). Over the following winter, a lounge was constructed in the upper part of this area and new rows of juniper bushes were placed in the lower part.

By the end of 1937, the dimensions were set: 355 feet to the left field corner, a few feet behind where the corner wall tangents the foul pole; 368 to fairly deep left-center; 400 to the deepest part of center (at the right edge of the batters background area); 368 to right center; and 353 to the right field foul pole. There are other intriguing distances that have never been posted. In the original Encyclopedia of Baseball, by Hy Turkin and S.C. Thompson, 1951, measurements of 357 feet to the left field "well" and 363 to the right field "well" were revealed. That would put the closest point of the left end of the bleachers no more than about 350 feet from home plate, a fact many pitchers have cursed over the years. Left-center in general is shallow. Straightaway center is probably about 390. Deep center and the right field area in general are better balanced. But the shallowness of the left-center power alley, really too cozy for major league standards, and the resultant increase in home runs in the decades since 1937, suggest that the Chicago Tribune's original skeptical assessment was correct.

The "basket", an angling chain-link fence that runs along the top of the outfield wall, was installed at the start of the 1970 season. During the 1969 pennant race, there were several incidents of fans interfering with fly balls and even falling onto the field. There was also the first and only incident of a fan running the field and escaping without prosecution. A famous photograph was taken of the incident and published in the Chicago Sun-Times. The basket was intended to deter or prevent that kind of problem. Security cameras were also installed at that time. The "basket" angles away from the wall, and is also higher than the wall in order to provide some balance for the pitchers. However, over the years a number of baseballs have been hit "into the basket" for home runs that previously would have been outs, or off the wall, or possibly interfered with by fans. The basket only exists where there is seating. During the 1980s, when the bleacher seating was extended over the "catwalks", i.e. the bleacher ramps in extreme left and right fields, the basket was likewise extended.

=== First attempt at lights (1941) ===
Lights were scheduled to be added to Wrigley Field in 1942, but after the Japanese attack on Pearl Harbor, then-owner Philip K. Wrigley (son of the late William) donated the necessary materials to the war effort. Founded by P.K. Wrigley, the All-American Girls Professional Baseball League (known for the first half of the 1943 season as the All-American Girls Softball League) began their inaugural season of play in the spring of 1943. On the evening of July 1, 1943, teams from the All-American League played an exhibition game at Wrigley Field as part of a Women's Army Corps (WAC) recruiting rally, attracting approximately 7,000 fans. With temporary lighting set up behind home plate along the first and third base lines, this would be the first night game to be played at Wrigley Field. The All-American Girls Baseball League would play the second ever night game at Wrigley the following year in another war drive exhibition.

Baseball boomed after the war, allowing P. K. Wrigley to procrastinate on the issue of permanent lighting. He eventually decided never to install lights for a variety of publicly stated reasons, so Wrigley Field remained a bastion of day baseball until the Chicago Tribune Company era, which began in 1981; the first night game with permanent lighting was not until 1988.

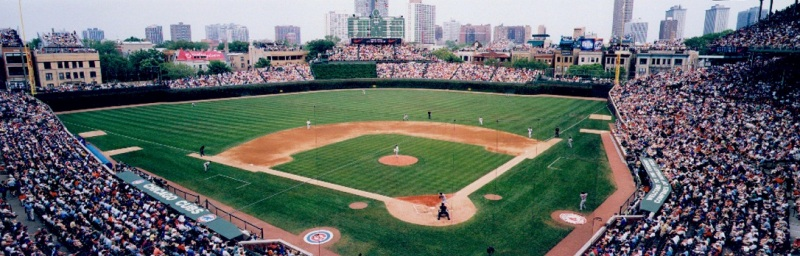
Chicago Cubs vs Boston Red Sox - Interleague play in June 2005

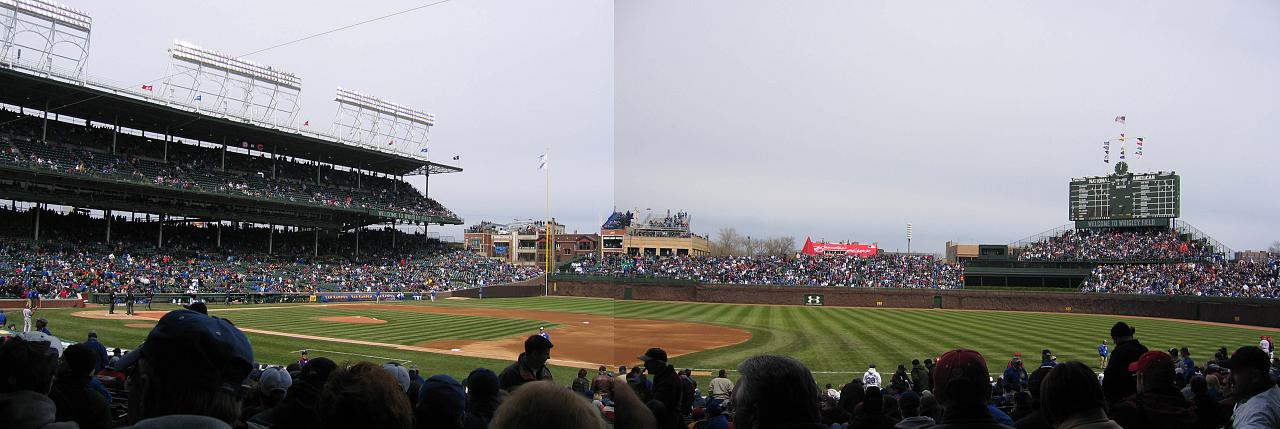
Panoramic view of Wrigley Field

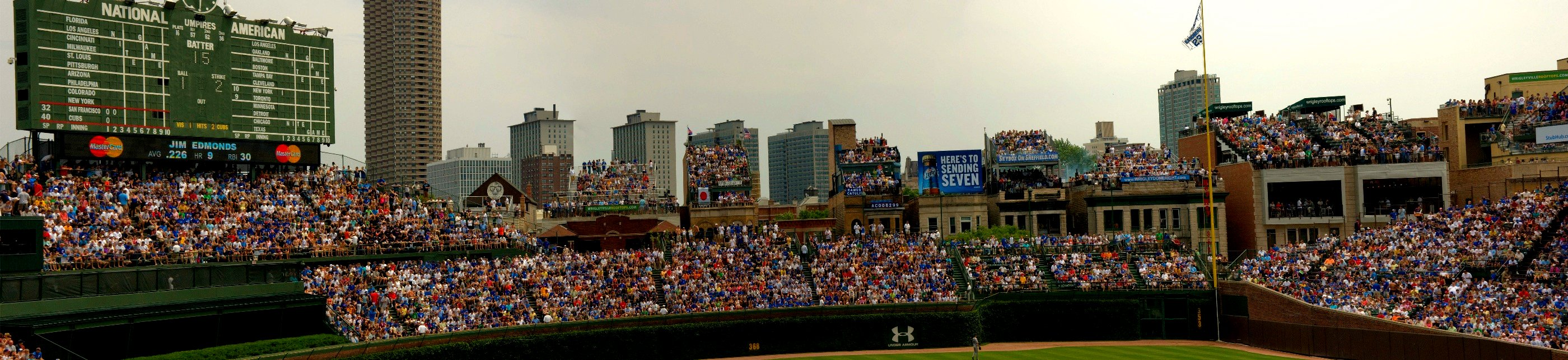
Panoramic view of Wrigley field in 2008

== "Building a New Tradition in the Friendly Confines" (1981–present) ==
=== Night baseball (1988) ===
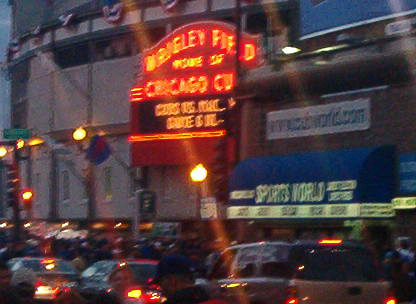
Wrigleyville under the lights during game 6 of the 2003 NLCS

The Cubs had been run almost like a hobby by the Wrigleys, but the Tribune Company was interested in the Cubs strictly as a business. The new owners started talking lights and began stirring debate on the matter. One of P. K. Wrigley's stated reasons for not installing lights was that it would upset the neighborhood, and the initial negative reaction to the Tribune Company's intentions validated P. K.'s prediction.

Resistance to the installation of lights was not limited to those who lived nearby and opposed the lights on the practical grounds of bothersome brightness or the noise and crowds from night games. Many Cubs fans who lived outside Wrigleyville opposed the idea simply due to the fact that the Cubs' stance as the last team to resist night baseball was a point of pride, as it was seen as a vestige of baseball's heritage as a pastoral game, played in natural sunlight. Some Cubs fans also had fond associations with Gabby Hartnett's famous "Homer in the Gloamin'," in which Hartnett hit a crucial home run in the bottom of the ninth of a game on the verge of being called for darkness, helping the Cubs to win the 1938 pennant.

The city of Chicago had passed an ordinance banning night events at Wrigley Field, due to its presence in the residential Lakeview neighborhood, so Tribune was unable to install lights unless the ordinance was repealed. They compromised by scheduling a significant number of 3:00 starts, which typically carried games into the evening but did not require lights for games that completed within three hours or so.

This debate continued for several years, and became more intense as the Cubs returned to competitiveness during the early 1980s. When the Cubs won the NL East division title in 1984, then-commissioner Bowie Kuhn announced that the Cubs would lose home field advantage should they advance to the World Series (home field advantage alternated between the champions of the National League and American League until 2003), since by this time nearly all World Series games were played at night in the Eastern and Central time zones. After winning their two scheduled home (day) games in the National League Championship Series, the Cubs lost all three games in San Diego, so Kuhn's threat became moot. But the following season, new commissioner Peter Ueberroth announced that because Wrigley Field had no lights, the Cubs would have to play all future postseason games at another ballpark, most likely the White Sox' Comiskey Park, Busch Stadium in St. Louis, or County Stadium in Milwaukee. The Cubs fell out of contention over the next several years, however, so the possibility of their playing postseason "home" games at other venues did not arise.

The Cubs, under team president Dallas Green, quickly changed the issue from lights or no lights to Wrigley Field or move out of town. With typical bluntness, Green said, "if there are no lights in Wrigley Field, there will be no Wrigley Field." Green seriously considered shuttering Wrigley and playing at Comiskey Park as tenants of the White Sox for a year, in hopes that the neighborhood would feel the loss of revenue and back down. The Cubs also explored moving to several suburban locations, including a site adjacent to Arlington Park in Arlington Heights and another in Schaumburg. There was even talk of a drastic move which involved selling the stadium to local college DePaul University, who would likely tear down Wrigley Field to host its indoor sports or convert it to a full-time football stadium in hopes of returning football to the campus. The Cubs would then likely build a new ballpark near the Rosemont Horizon (now the Allstate Arena, where DePaul plays its home games currently) in suburban Rosemont.

The Cubs' new stance quickly changed the context of the debate, as even the most adamant opponents of adding lights did not want to see the Cubs leave for the suburbs. Schaumburg officials were so convinced that the Cubs were actually coming that land was purchased by investors hoping to build a new ballpark off the Elgin-O'Hare Expressway west of I-355. When the Cubs and the city of Chicago came to an agreement to keep the team on the North Side, the site spawned a ballpark anyway, with field dimensions and shape identical to Wrigley Field, even mimicking the "wells" along the outfield wall, and the 'dogleg' in the visitor's dugout along the first base line. That stadium, Boomers Stadium (formerly known as Alexian Field), is now home to the (non-affiliated) minor league Schaumburg Boomers.

In the fall of 1987, Chicago mayor Harold Washington proposed a compromise ordinance to the Chicago City Council which allowed the Cubs to install lights, but limited the number of night games per year. Washington died a week after the compromise was proposed, but the city eventually approved a compromise in February 1988 under interim mayor Eugene Sawyer. Major League Baseball responded by awarding the Cubs the 1990 All-Star Game.

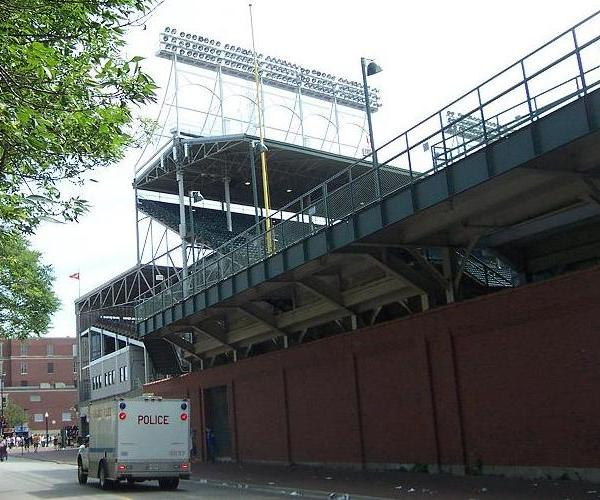
Lights, bleacher expansion, and exterior ivy

The first major league night game at Wrigley was attempted on August 8 against the Philadelphia Phillies, but was rained out after 3½ innings. The delay happened during a Severe Thunderstorm Warning that was issued shortly before the delay at 7:27 PM CT for northwestern Cook, northwest DuPage, north central Kane, south central Lake, and southeastern McHenry counties. During the rain delay, several Cubs players, imitating a scene in the recent film hit, Bull Durham, played "slip-and-slide" on the tarp. One source says the group included Greg Maddux, Al Nipper, Les Lancaster and Jody Davis. Manager Don Zimmer was not amused, and they were fined $500 apiece.

The first official night game was played the following night, August 9 against the New York Mets (in front of a nationally televised audience watching Vin Scully and Joe Garagiola call the game on NBC), ending a streak of 5,687 consecutive home day games. However, this was not the first night game of any kind at Wrigley, as in the 1940s, some AAGPBL night games were played in Wrigley Field using temporary lighting structures; specifically, the All-Star Game held in July 1943, was the first night baseball game there, according to the Lowry book and the movie A League of Their Own.

Starting with their first full season with lights, in 1989, as part of the compromise with the city, the Cubs were limited to 18 night games within their 81-game regular season schedule, plus any post-season games that might have to be played at night for TV scheduling reasons. The timing of the lights' installation proved fortuitous, as the Cubs reached the post-season in 1989. Their first two post-season night games were the first two games of the NLCS, on October 4 and 5. They lost the first game against the San Francisco Giants 11–3, and won the second game 9–5.

The Cubs' post-season appearances since 1988 (as well as their one-game regular-season playoff with San Francisco in 1998) have featured mostly night games, the exceptions (as of 2007) being the fourth game of their 2003 NLDS matchup with the Atlanta Braves and third game of the 2007 NLDS against the Arizona Diamondbacks, both of which were Saturday afternoon contests.

In recent years, the Cubs have successfully lobbied for additional regular-season night games (up to a potential 30 per year, as of 2007). However, per their agreement with the city, they still play most of their games during the day. Due to the limited night schedule, night games at Wrigley Field are considered an "event" and are almost always sold out well in advance. Some observers compare the atmosphere of a Wrigley Field night game to that of Rush and Division streets, the longtime epicenter of Chicago's nightclub scene.

Wrigley Field has continuously evolved over its 90-plus seasons. There is relatively little left of the original that is visible to the casual viewer. One of the more obvious originals were the brick portions of the outer bleacher wall, visible in the "back of Wrigley Field" photo. The Cubs' bleacher expansion resulted in removal of those bricks, which were later sold to the public individually at a "garage sale" at the start of the 2006 season.

=== Bleacher expansion and renovation (2005–2006) ===
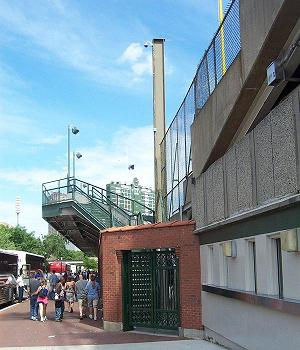
2005–2006 bleacher expansion
extending over sidewalk

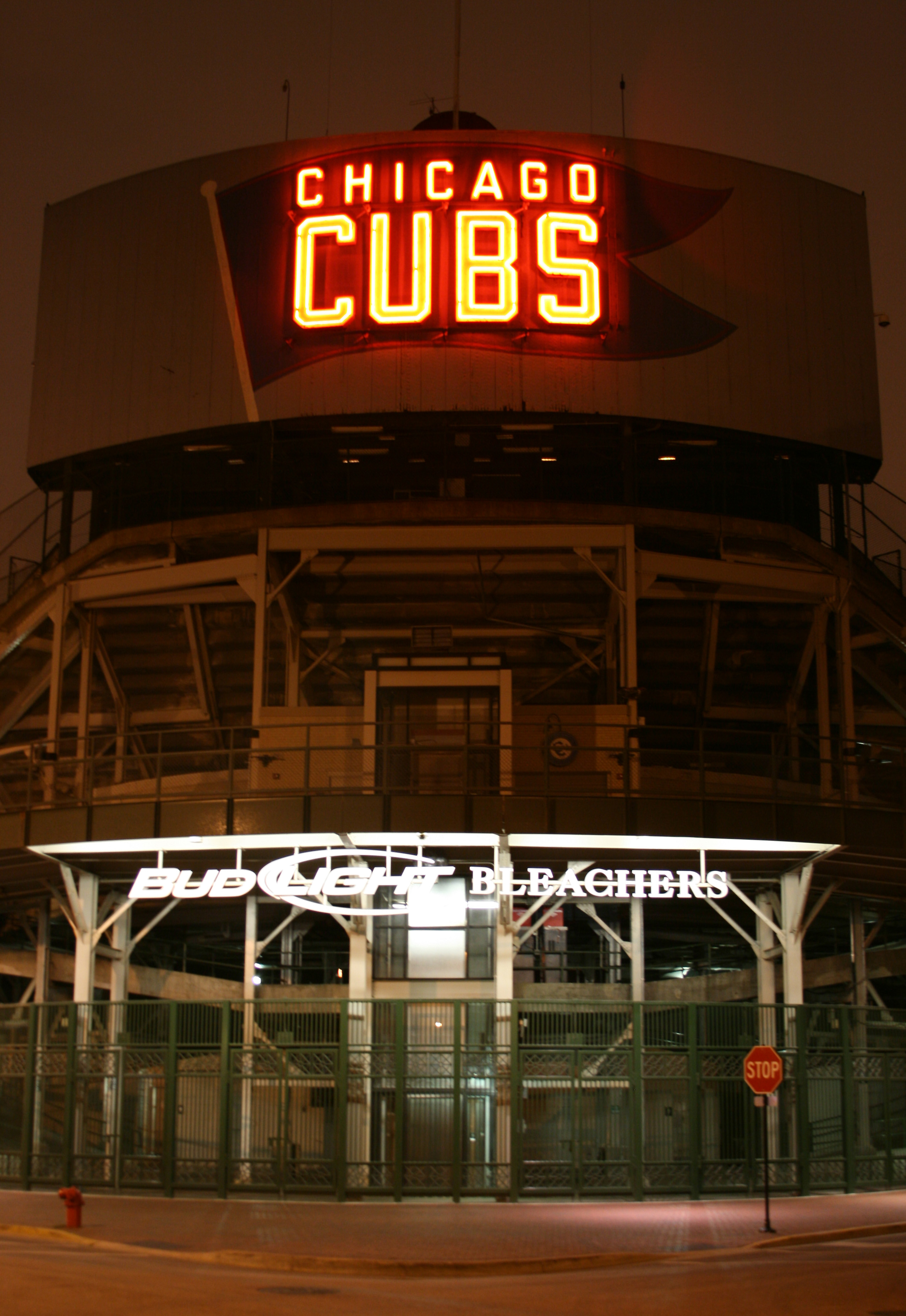
Remodeled bleacher
entrance

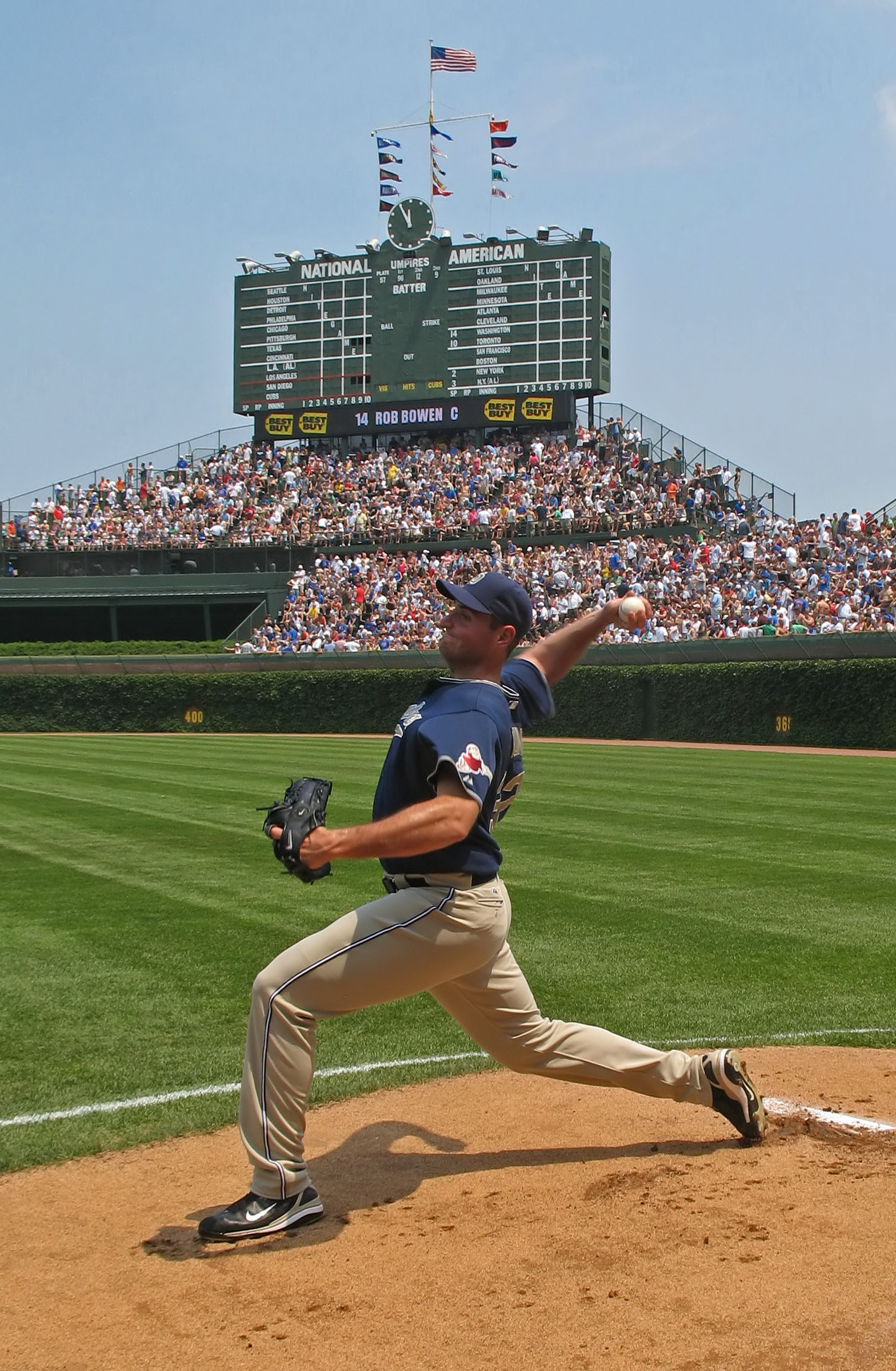
Chris Young in the bullpen located in playable foul territory, with remodeled center field area in background

After lengthy debate, the reconstruction and expansion of the bleachers (by some 1,900 seats) finally began after the close of the 2005 season, although it was strongly opposed by Chicago Mayor Richard Daley. The first part of the process was to remove the outer brick wall, one of the last vestiges of the 1914 structure. Additionally, much of the 1937 construction behind the inner ivy-covered wall was removed (except for the steel supports and the center field upper tier) and the former sidewalk was excavated. The work progressed quickly throughout the winter, aided by the relatively mild Midwestern January.

The original concept called for the bleachers to simply extend out over the sidewalks, supported by open steel columns in cantilevered design, connecting new steel to the existing steel that supported the old bleachers. That plan was altered somewhat when it was feared the area would become an impromptu homeless shelter. Thus the vertical part of the supporting structure for the new bleachers was encased in a wall constructed of new bricks, in a style reminiscent of the original wall, and the sidewalk (repaved in brick) became a few feet narrower. The only part hanging over the sidewalk is the flat walkway behind the bleachers. The upper part of the formerly vacant center field area is occupied by a large luxury suite, fronted by darkened, slanted windows so as not to interfere with the batters' sight lines, and the lower part by juniper plants that had been temporarily removed. Another notable change to the configuration was to replace the solid door in the right field corner with a chain-link fence gate, so passers-by can see part of the ballfield (an idea borrowed from Oracle Park).

Various Internet sites displayed photos tracking the progress of construction. The results support what management had stated, that the changes would not depart radically from the previous structure.

On March 30, 2006, the Cubs announced the bleachers would be renamed the Bud Light bleachers. A sign to that effect was soon posted over the bleacher entryway which contrasts significantly with its previous look. The Cubs management also announced they would plant ivy on the rebuilt exterior walls, in a soil trough that was provided as part of the construction. Conventional Boston ivy was planted on the east-facing Sheffield wall, which gets a fair amount of sunlight during morning hours. The north-facing wall along Waveland, which receives little direct sunlight in the summer and none in the winter, was to have an "evergreen" variety, English ivy, which thrives in shade.

The bleacher expansion project was designed by HOK Architecture, of Kansas City Missouri with Osborn Engineering of Cleveland, Ohio serving as the engineer.

On January 4, 2008, the Cubs got permission to add 80 new seats to the ballpark. The Cubs also got permission to add new signs. Wrigley Field will now hold up to 41,198 people after adding the seats.

=== Giving Wrigley a new Field (2007–2008) ===
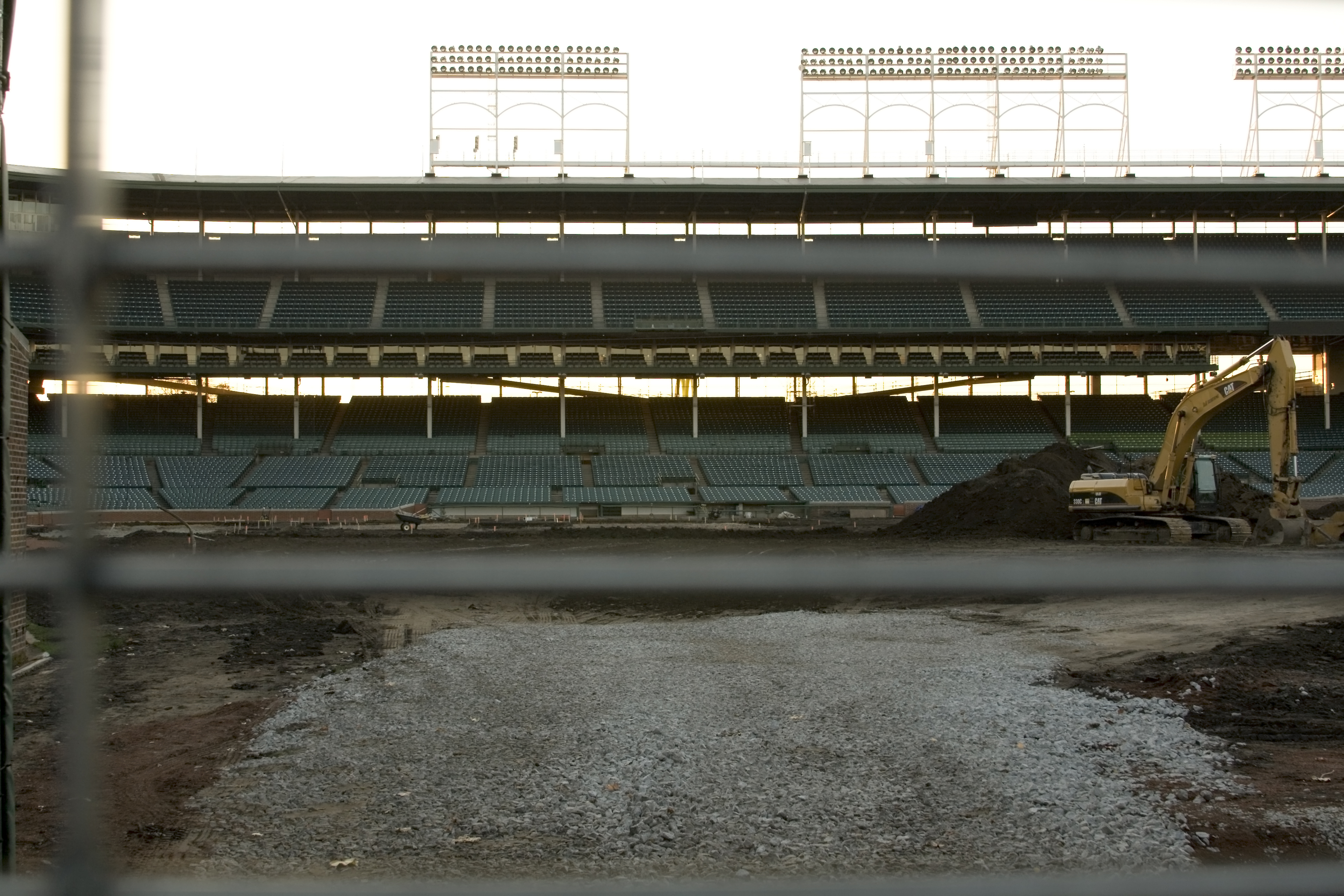
The turf replacement in progress through Wrigley's right field fan window

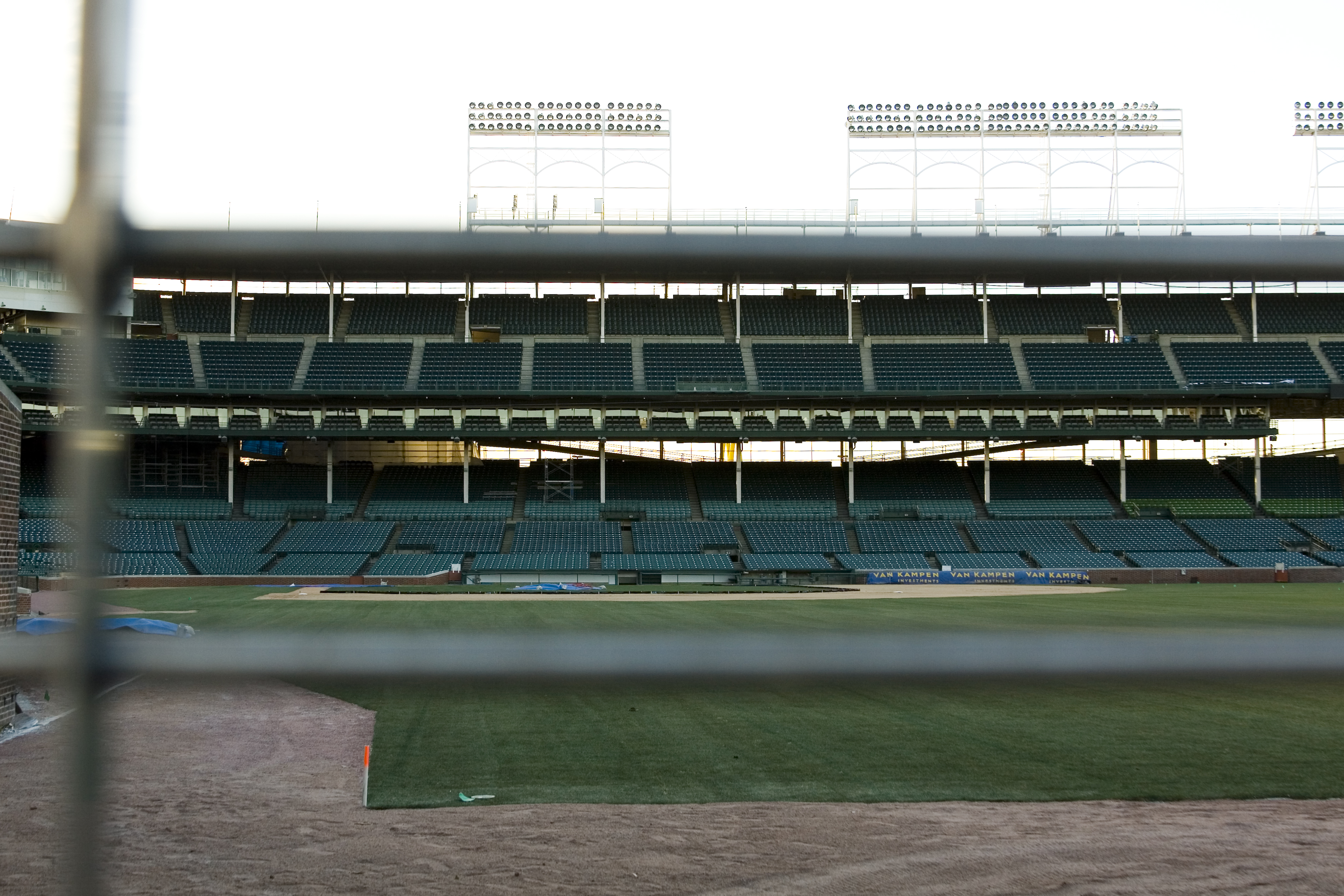
After view of the turf replacement

At the end of the Cubs' 2007 season, two different efforts were undertaken to upgrade the playing field at the old ballpark. A few years earlier, a Sports Illustrated poll found that the players considered Wrigley's playing field to be one of the poorest in the Major Leagues. The renovations should go a long way toward fixing that situation.

First, as reported on the Cubs official website and also reported and pictured in the November issue of Chicago Cubs Vine Line, the Cubs official fan magazine (p. 4), the outfield and portions of the infield were replaced by turf purchased from an Oswego, Illinois, firm. This was accomplished in the 13 days between the last home regular season game and the first (and last, as it turned out) post-season game for the year. The project was supervised by Roger Bossard, who is the head groundskeeper for the Chicago White Sox.

Then, following the post-season, as reported on the Cubs website and also reported and pictured in the December issue of Vine Line, a more ambitious project began, to install a state-of-the-art drainage system. The entire playing surface at Wrigley was removed, which required digging down 14 to 28 inches (36 to 71 cm). The underlying base material was replaced by a system of 6,000 feet (1,800 m) of piping buried in a special clay. The drainage system capable of holding 60,000 gallons of water was installed, on top of which a new playing surface of Colorado-grown sod was unrolled. This renovation, replacing a system installed in 1935, makes Wrigley the last Major League field to move away from a crown-based water management system. The infield had been at a somewhat raised elevation relative to the shallow part of the outfield and the far edge of the foul ground around the infield, hence the gutters in front of the box seat railings.

As of 2008, the infield now sits lower than it did, by 14 inches (36 cm), eliminating the slight downhill slope that runners had to contend with upon rounding third base, and also allowing the managers in the dugouts to see the opposite-field outfielder in full, not just his "top half". The system allows for much shorter rain delays, while also controlling the flow of water toward the storm sewers. The ballpark sits on a block that has a noticeable downhill slope from the northwest corner to the southeast corner. The left field (northwest) corner of the playing field is several feet below street level. The natural drainage direction is toward the right field (southeast) corner, and the new system directs all the water through an outlet under the right field corner.

As part of the excavation, the crew found and removed the foundations of the goal posts from the Bears' playing days. The crew also reported that they left a "time capsule" buried somewhere under the new turf. Lowering the infield by 14 inches (36 cm) also effectively raises the outfield barrier by 14 inches (36 cm), from the standpoint of the batter. It remains to be seen whether that factor will have any effect on home run production.

=== Will it remain Wrigley Field? (2007–2008) ===
Tribune owner Sam Zell announced that he would consider selling the naming rights for Wrigley Field in order to help reduce the Tribune Company's $13 billion debt. Based on the recent sponsorship deals at the time, it was estimated that naming rights for the park were worth at least $10 million per year. Many Chicago baseball fans thought that the park is too historic to have the name changed, and some experts projected that naming rights would have commanded a lower cost in comparison to newer parks because of the anticipated fan backlash, to which Zell stated in an interview with Crain's Chicago Business:

'Wrigley Field, the Cubs and all the land around it is an asset of the company -- including the right to name the park. Based on the sales of naming rights around the country, this would probably qualify as being extraordinarily valuable. Could that be part of an equation? Of course.'

Even if the name of the stadium had changed, the famous Wrigley Field Marquee would have stayed the same. The marquee is protected by the Chicago city council, and declared a local landmark.

=== Sale of the Cubs (2009) ===
With Tribune's sale of the Cubs (and Wrigley Field) to Thomas S. Ricketts in 2009, further improvements to the park were developed, including construction of the long-discussed "triangle building" immediately to the west of the park at the intersection of Clark Street and Waveland Avenue, which would house some of the team's offices as well as a retail concourse and weight room for the players. Ricketts has also stated, "We don't have any naming-rights discussions going on at all. I think Wrigley is the name we are going to go with."

=== Daktronics video screens and bleacher reconstruction (2014–2017) ===
In October 2014 demolition began on a three-year renovation project under the ownership of Ricketts. Bleacher expansion, a pair of Daktronics video boards in left and right field, and five outfield signs were slated to debut by Opening Day 2015, but were hampered by winter weather, and construction extended well into the 2015 season. With the city of Chicago vacating Seminary Street directly west of the ballpark, construction crews also laid the foundation for a 30,000-square-foot (2,800 m^{2}) underground clubhouse beneath it, and triangular lot bordered by Clark, Waveland, and the park. Construction was complete for the start of the 2016 season. At grade level above the clubhouse, the Cubs created an outdoor space that is open to anyone, with or without a ticket, with seating, grassy areas, and additional vendor kiosks. Called "The Park at Wrigley", this area houses an ice rink for open skating during the winter. Restoration of the groundskeeper's house (which from 1923 to 1957 was the home of the stadium groundskeeper) at the northwestern corner of the park was also completed in 2016.

News report by Voice of America about ticket prices at the 2016 World Series, the first world series game at Wrigley Field in 71 years

Other major changes, such as installing a new gate on the west side of the ballpark, relocating bullpens from along foul-lines to underneath the bleachers, and additional seating in the foul territory formerly occupied by the bullpens, were completed in time for the 2017 season. A complete renovation of the visitor's locker room is scheduled for the winter of 2018–19. Additional significant renovations planned include: "bunker suites"—suites that would have no view of the field, but would instead lead to seating areas—beneath the concourse down the third-base line; removal of old ramps to the upper deck to be replaced with stairs; new elevators to comply with Americans with Disabilities Act regulations; and additional signage on the grandstand facade, which includes a ribbon-style board.

Construction of the video screens were controversial and met with resistance by some fans who oppose putting video screens at Wrigley in deference to tradition and is strenuously opposed by the rooftop owners association, owners of 15 rooftop clubs overlooking Wrigley who have a contract with the Cubs that runs through 2023 requiring them to pay the team 17 percent of their gross annual revenue. The association said the new signs would cut down their view of the ballpark and "would absolutely violate our 20-year contract, just as they violate the spirit of Wrigley’s long-standing landmark status." Owners of the rooftop clubs sued the city in August 2014, seeking to block the expansion. However, many of the association owners have sold their properties to the Ricketts family, paving the way for the completion of the bleacher project.

== See also ==
- List of events at Wrigley Field
- History of the Chicago Cubs
- History of the Chicago Bears
- History of the Arizona Cardinals
