= International Cat Day =

Annual celebration on 8 August

- Observed by: International
- Date: 8 August
- Next time: 8 August 2027
- Frequency: Annual

International Cat Day is a celebration which takes place on 8 August of every year. It was created in 2002 by the International Fund for Animal Welfare. It is a day to raise awareness for cats and learn about ways to help and protect them.

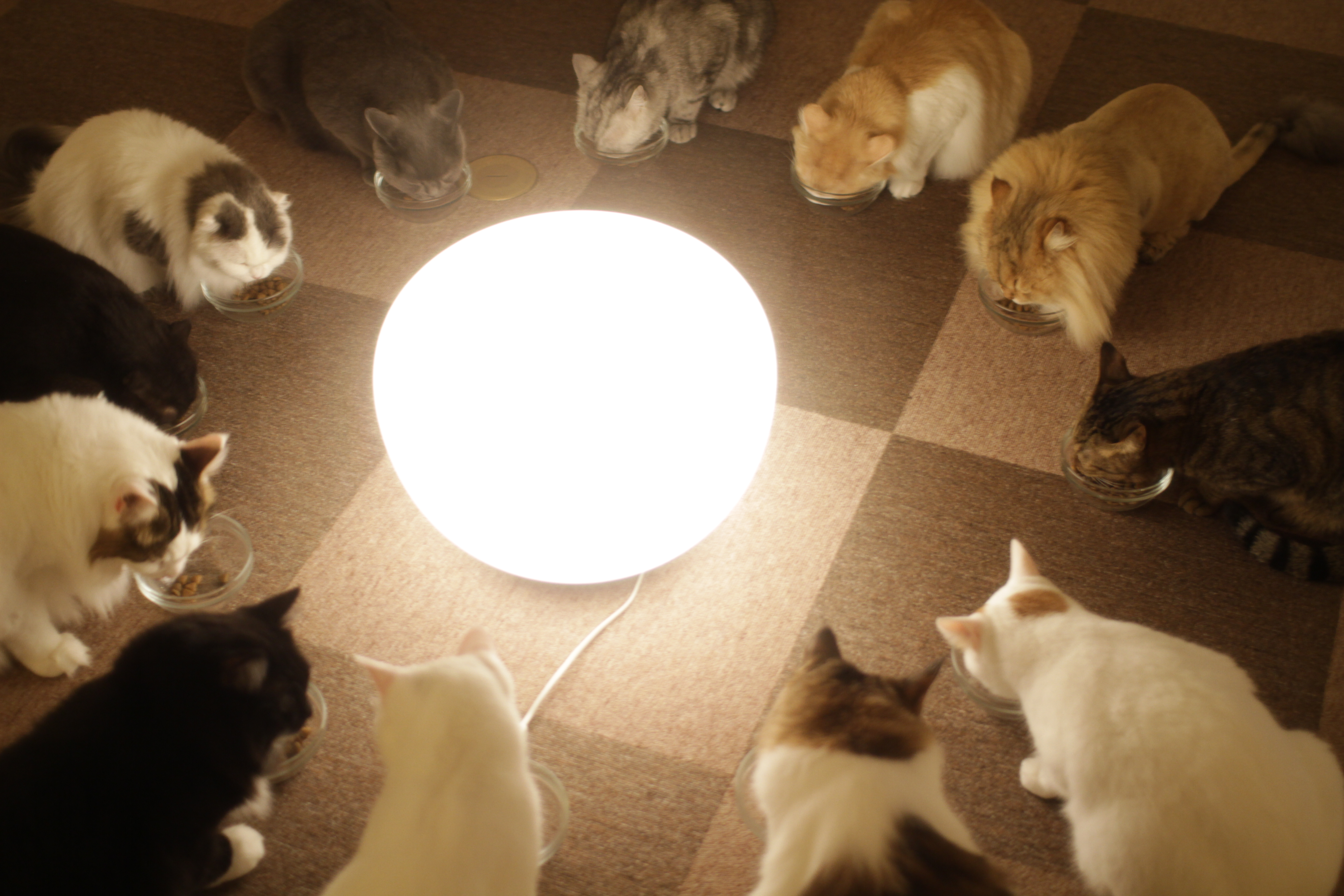

In 2020, custodianship of International Cat Day passed to International Cat Care, a not-for-profit British organization that has been striving to improve the health and welfare of domestic cats worldwide since 1958.

== See also ==
- National Cat Day, which varies by country
