= Darreh Garm =

Darreh Garm or Darreh-ye Garm or Darrehgarm (Persian: دره گرم) may refer to:

- Darreh Garm, Fars
- Darreh-ye Garm, Khuzestan
- Darreh Garm, Kohgiluyeh and Boyer-Ahmad
- Darreh Garm, Borujerd, Lorestan Province
- Darreh Garm, Khorramabad, Lorestan Province
- Darreh Garm, Markazi
- Darreh Garm, Sistan and Baluchestan

== See also ==
- Garm Darreh
