= Gushki =

Gushki or Gushaki (Persian: گوشكي) may refer to:

- Gushki, Chaharmahal and Bakhtiari
- Gushki, Hormozgan
- Gushki, alternate name of Kharkushi, Hormozgan Province
- Gushki-ye Bala, Lorestan Province
- Gushki-ye Pain, Lorestan Province

== See also ==
- Kushki (disambiguation)
