= Kushki =

Kushki (Persian: كوشكي) may refer to:

- Kushki, Dowreh, Lorestan Province
- Kushki, Pol-e Dokhtar, Lorestan Province
- Kushki Do, Khuzestan Province
- Kushki-ye Olya
- Kushki-ye Sofla
- Seyyed Karim-e Kushki
- Kushki, North Khorasan
- Kushki Kikanlu, North Khorasan Province
- Kushki Raji, North Khorasan Province
- Kushki Torkaman, North Khorasan Province
- Kushki, a cheetah

== See also ==
- Gushki (disambiguation)
