= Gondal =

Gondal may refer to:

== Places ==
- Gondal, India, a city in Gujarat, India
  - Gondal Assembly constituency
  - Gondal railway station
- Gondal State, a princely state of the Bombay Presidency in colonial India
- Gondal, Attock, a town in Pakistan
- Gondal Bar, a region in Punjab, Pakistan
- Gondal, Somalia, an ancient town in Somalia
- Gondal (fictional country), a fictional country created by Emily and Anne Brontë

== People ==
- Gondal (clan), a clan of Jats and a surname in Pakistan
- Nazar Muhammad Gondal (born 1950), Pakistani politician
- Usman Gondal (born 1987), Pakistani footballer
- Vishal Gondal (born 1976), Indian entrepreneur

== See also ==
- Gondal Gilan, a village in Iran
- Gondalpara, a town in West Bengal, India
- Gundala gondal, a village in India
