= Qaleh Kazem =

Qaleh Kazem قلعه كاظم
- Village
- Location within Iran
- Coordinates: 34°00′34″N 48°48′46″E
- Country: Iran
- Province: Lorestan
- County: Borujerd
- Bakhsh: Oshtorinan
- Rural District: Oshtorinan

Population (2006)
  - Total: 70
- Time zone: UTC+3:30 (IRST)
  - Summer (DST): UTC+4:30 (IRDT)

Qaleh Kazem (Persian: قلعه كاظم, also Romanized as Qal‘eh Kāz̧em) is a village in Oshtorinan Rural District, Oshtorinan District, Borujerd County, Lorestan Province, Iran. At the 2006 census, its population was 70, in 18 families.
