= Bid Kalmeh =

Bid Kalmeh بيدكلمه
- Village
- Location within Iran
- Coordinates: 34°06′19″N 48°43′31″E
- Country: Iran
- Province: Lorestan
- County: Borujerd
- Bakhsh: Oshtorinan
- Rural District: Oshtorinan

Population (2006)
  - Total: 87
- Time zone: UTC+3:30 (IRST)
  - Summer (DST): UTC+4:30 (IRDT)

Bid Kalmeh (Persian: بيدكلمه, also Romanized as Bīd Kalmeh and Bid Kelmeh) is a village in Oshtorinan Rural District, Oshtorinan District, Borujerd County, Lorestan Province, Iran. At the 2006 census, its population was 87, in 33 families.
