= Nabiabad =

Nabiabad (Persian: نبي اباد) may refer to:

- Nabiabad, Khuzestan
- Nabiabad, Kurdistan
- Nabiabad, Lorestan
- Nabiabad, Mazandaran
- Nabiabad, Sistan and Baluchestan
- Nabiabad, West Azerbaijan
