= Liqenab =

Liqenab ليقناب
- Village
- Location within Iran
- Coordinates: 34°02′26″N 48°45′04″E
- Country: Iran
- Province: Lorestan
- County: Borujerd
- Bakhsh: Oshtorinan
- Rural District: Oshtorinan

Population (2006)
  - Total: 175
- Time zone: UTC+3:30 (IRST)
  - Summer (DST): UTC+4:30 (IRDT)

Liqenab (Persian: ليقناب, also Romanized as Līqenāb, Lighnab, Liqenāb, and Līqnāb) is a village in Oshtorinan Rural District, Oshtorinan District, Borujerd County, Lorestan Province, Iran. At the 2006 census, its population was 175, in 48 families.
