= Gundala =

Gundala may refer to:

== Comic Character ==
- Gundala Putra Petir (Gundala Son of Thunder), a comic superhero character from Indonesia

== Films ==
- Gundala Putra Petir (film), a 1981 Indonesian superhero film
- Gundala (film), a 2019 Indonesian superhero film
- Gundala the Son of Thunder, an upcoming Indonesian superhero film

== Places ==
- Gundala, a historical village since the princely state of Gondal, India
- Gundala, a village near Mundra town of Kutch district, Gujarat, India
- Gundala, Bhadradri Kothagudem district, a mandal in Telangana, India
- Gundala, Jangaon district, a mandal in Telangana, India
- Gundala, Mahabubnagar district, a village in Atmakur Mandal
- Gundala, Ranga Reddy district, a village in Ranga Reddy district, Telangana, India
- Gundalapadu, a village in Phirangipuram mandal, Guntur district, Andhra Pradesh, India
