= Jafarabad, Borujerd =

Village in Lorestan province, Iran

Jafarabad Persian: جعفراباد
- Village
- Location within Iran
- Coordinates: 34°03′44″N 48°33′04″E
- Country: Iran
- Province: Lorestan
- County: Borujerd
- District: Oshtorinan
- Rural District: Bardesareh

Population (2016)
  - Total: 2,282
- Time zone: UTC+3:30 (IRST)

Jafarabad (Persian: جعفراباد) (Note: Also romanized as Ja‘farābād; also known as Zafarābād) is a village in, and the capital of, Bardesareh Rural District in Oshtorinan District (Note: Formerly Ashtad District) of Borujerd County, Lorestan province, Iran. The previous capital of the rural district was the village of Qaid Taher, now in Gudarzi Rural District.

== Demographics ==
=== Population ===
At the time of the 2006 National Census, the village's population was 2,410 in 616 households. The following census in 2011 counted 2,479 people in 722 households. The 2016 census measured the population of the village as 2,282 people in 735 households, the most populous in its rural district.
