= Bardesareh Rural District =

Rural district in Lorestan province, Iran

Bardesareh Rural District Persian: دهستان بردسره
- Rural District
- Location within Iran
- Coordinates: 34°03′N 48°33′E
- Country: Iran
- Province: Lorestan
- County: Borujerd
- District: Oshtorinan
- Established: 1987
- Capital: Jafarabad

Population (2016)
  - Total: 6,853
- Time zone: UTC+3:30 (IRST)

Bardesareh Rural District (Persian: دهستان بردسره) is in Oshtorinan District (Note: Formerly Ashtad District) of Borujerd County, Lorestan province, Iran. Its capital is the village of Jafarabad. The previous capital of the rural district was the village of Qaid Taher, now in Gudarzi Rural District.

== Demographics ==
=== Population ===
At the time of the 2006 National Census, the rural district's population was 7,530 in 1,799 households. There were 7,170 inhabitants in 2,015 households at the following census of 2011. The 2016 census measured the population of the rural district as 6,853 in 2,074 households. The most populous of its 16 villages was Jafarabad, with 417 people.

=== Other villages in the rural district ===
- Aliabad
- Angoshteh
- Asgharabad
- Bardeh Sareh
- Chaqabol
- Deh Riz
- Fathabad
- Jujeh Heydar
- Magasan-e Bala
- Nabiabad
- Rezaabad
- Shab Mah
