= Kheshtianak =

Village in Lorestan province, Iran

Kheshtianak Persian: خشتيانك
- Village
- Location within Iran
- Coordinates: 33°57′15″N 48°38′19″E
- Country: Iran
- Province: Lorestan
- County: Borujerd
- District: Oshtorinan
- Rural District: Gudarzi

Population (2016)
  - Total: 497
- Time zone: UTC+3:30 (IRST)

Kheshtianak (Persian: خشتيانك) (Note: Also romanized as Kheshtīānak and Kheshtyānak; also known as Kishtiyānāk) is a village in Gudarzi Rural District of Oshtorinan District (Note: Formerly Ashtad District) in Borujerd County, Lorestan province, Iran.

== Demographics ==
=== Population ===
At the time of the 2006 National Census, the village's population was 675 in 173 households. The following census in 2011 counted 534 people in 152 households. The 2016 census measured the population of the village as 497 people in 156 households.
