= Magasan-e Bala =

Village in Lorestan province, Iran

Magasan-e Bala Persian: مگسان بالا
- Village
- Location within Iran
- Coordinates: 34°02′24″N 48°31′22″E
- Country: Iran
- Province: Lorestan
- County: Borujerd
- District: Oshtorinan
- Rural District: Bardesareh

Population (2016)
  - Total: 151
- Time zone: UTC+3:30 (IRST)

Magasan-e Bala (Persian: مگسان بالا) (Note: Also Romanized as Magasān-e Bālā; formerly known as Magasan-e Olya (مگسان عليا), also romanized as Magasān-e ‘Olyā; also known as Magasān and Mohammadabad (محمدآباد), also romanized as Moḩammadābād) is a village in Bardesareh Rural District of Oshtorinan District (Note: Formerly Ashtad District) in Borujerd County, Lorestan province, Iran.

== Demographics ==
=== Population ===
At the time of the 2006 National Census, the village's population, as Magasan-e Olya, was 207 in 45 households. The following census in 2011 counted 32 people in seven households, by which time the village was listed as Magasan-e Bala The 2016 census measured the population of the village as 151 people in 47 households.
