= Chahar Barreh =

Village in Lorestan province, Iran

Chahar Barreh Persian: چهاربره
- Village
- Location within Iran
- Coordinates: 33°58′57″N 48°35′43″E
- Country: Iran
- Province: Lorestan
- County: Borujerd
- District: Oshtorinan
- Rural District: Gudarzi

Population (2016)
  - Total: 1,052
- Time zone: UTC+3:30 (IRST)

Chahar Barreh (Persian: چهاربره) (Note: Also romanized as Chahār Bareh, Chahār Barreh, and Chahār Borah; also known as Chehār Būrreh) is a village in Gudarzi Rural District of Oshtorinan District (Note: Formerly Ashtad District) in Borujerd County, Lorestan province, Iran.

== Demographics ==
=== Population ===
At the time of the 2006 National Census, the village's population was 1,065 in 290 households. The following census in 2011 counted 1,030 people in 302 households. The 2016 census measured the population of the village as 1,052 people in 320 households.

== Notable people ==
- Mahmoud Saremi, Iranian reporter, was born in Chahar Barreh; his killing by the Taliban is marked annually as Reporters' Day in Iran.
