= Asgharabad, Borujerd =

Village in Lorestan province, Iran

Asgharabad Persian: اصغراباد
- Village
- Location within Iran
- Coordinates: 34°02′52″N 48°32′35″E
- Country: Iran
- Province: Lorestan
- County: Borujerd
- District: Oshtorinan
- Rural District: Bardesareh

Population (2016)
  - Total: 30
- Time zone: UTC+3:30 (IRST)

Asgharabad (Persian: اصغراباد) (Note: Also romanized as Aşgharābād) is a village in Bardesareh Rural District of Oshtorinan District (Note: Formerly Ashtad District) in Borujerd County, Lorestan province, Iran.

== Demographics ==
=== Population ===
At the time of the 2006 National Census, the village's population was 65 in 13 households. The following census in 2011 counted 50 people in 13 households. The 2016 census measured the population of the village as 30 people in nine households.
