= Aliabad, Borujerd =

Village in Lorestan province, Iran

Aliabad Persian: علي اباد
- Village
- Location within Iran
- Coordinates: 34°02′35″N 48°34′37″E
- Country: Iran
- Province: Lorestan
- County: Borujerd
- District: Oshtorinan
- Rural District: Bardesareh

Population (2016)
  - Total: 25
- Time zone: UTC+3:30 (IRST)

Aliabad (Persian: علي اباد) (Note: Also romanized as `Alīābād) is a village in Bardesareh Rural District of Oshtorinan District (Note: Formerly Ashtad District) in Borujerd County, Lorestan province, Iran.

== Demographics ==
=== Population ===
At the time of the 2006 National Census, the village's population was 21 in five households. The following census in 2011 counted 26 people in seven households. The 2016 census measured the population of the village as 25 people in seven households.
