= Kafshgaran =

Village in Lorestan province, Iran

Kafshgaran Persian: كفشگران
- Village
- Location within Iran
- Coordinates: 33°56′23″N 48°37′14″E
- Country: Iran
- Province: Lorestan
- County: Borujerd
- District: Oshtorinan
- Rural District: Gudarzi

Population (2016)
  - Total: 1,256
- Time zone: UTC+3:30 (IRST)

Kafshgaran (Persian: كفشگران) (Note: Also romanized as Kafshgarān; also known as Kafshgiran and Kafshgīrān) is a village in Gudarzi Rural District of Oshtorinan District (Note: Formerly Ashtad District) in Borujerd County, Lorestan province, Iran.

== Demographics ==
=== Population ===
At the time of the 2006 National Census, the village's population was 1,434 in 356 households. The following census in 2011 counted 1,451 people in 423 households. The 2016 census measured the population of the village as 1,256 people in 389 households.
