= Takderakht =

Village in Lorestan province, Iran

Takderakht Persian: تک‌درخت
- Village
- Location within Iran
- Coordinates: 33°58′24″N 48°38′44″E
- Country: Iran
- Province: Lorestan
- County: Borujerd
- District: Oshtorinan
- Rural District: Gudarzi

Population (2016)
  - Total: Below reporting threshold
- Time zone: UTC+3:30 (IRST)

Takderakht (Persian: تكدرخت) (Note: Also romanized as Takdarkhat) is a village in Gudarzi Rural District of Oshtorinan District (Note: Formerly Ashtad District) in Borujerd County, Lorestan province, Iran.

== Demographics ==
=== Population ===
At the time of the 2006 National Census, the village's population was 22 in seven households. The following censuses in 2011 and 2016 counted a population below the reporting threshold.
