= Golchehran =

Village in Lorestan province, Iran

Golchehran Persian: گلچهران
- Village
- Location within Iran
- Coordinates: 33°59′25″N 48°39′15″E
- Country: Iran
- Province: Lorestan
- County: Borujerd
- District: Oshtorinan
- Rural District: Gudarzi

Population (2016)
  - Total: 667
- Time zone: UTC+3:30 (IRST)

Golchehran (Persian: گلچهران) (Note: Also romanized as Golchehrān; also known as Kucharān and Kulcharān) is a village in Gudarzi Rural District of Oshtorinan District (Note: Formerly Ashtad District) in Borujerd County, Lorestan province, Iran.

== Demographics ==
=== Population ===
At the time of the 2006 National Census, the village's population was 757 in 200 households. The following census in 2011 counted 654 people in 200 households. The 2016 census measured the population of the village as 667 people in 230 households.
