= Bondizeh =

Village in Lorestan province, Iran

Bondizeh Persian: بنديزه
- Village
- Location within Iran
- Coordinates: 33°58′13″N 48°38′06″E
- Country: Iran
- Province: Lorestan
- County: Borujerd
- District: Oshtorinan
- Rural District: Gudarzi

Population (2016)
  - Total: 1,017
- Time zone: UTC+3:30 (IRST)

Bondizeh (Persian: بنديزه) (Note: Also romanized as Bondīzeh; also known as Bon Vīzeh, Bunarīzeh, and Būnrīzeh) is a village in, and the capital of, Gudarzi Rural District in Oshtorinan District (Note: Formerly Ashtad District) of Borujerd County, Lorestan province, Iran.

== Demographics ==
=== Population ===
At the time of the 2006 National Census, the village's population was 1,074 in 286 households. The following census in 2011 counted 976 people in 286 households. The 2016 census measured the population of the village as 1,017 people in 317 households.
