= Fathabad, Borujerd =

Village in Lorestan province, Iran

Fathabad Persian: فتح اباد
- Village
- Location within Iran
- Coordinates: 34°02′25″N 48°36′17″E
- Country: Iran
- Province: Lorestan
- County: Borujerd
- District: Oshtorinan
- Rural District: Bardesareh

Population (2016)
  - Total: 0
- Time zone: UTC+3:30 (IRST)

Fathabad (Persian: فتح اباد) (Note: Also romanized as Fatḩābād) is a village in Bardesareh Rural District of Oshtorinan District (Note: Formerly Ashtad District) in Borujerd County, Lorestan province, Iran.

== Demographics ==
=== Population ===
At the time of the 2006 National Census, the village's population was 29 in nine households. The following census in 2011 counted a population below the reporting threshold. The 2016 census measured the population of the village as zero.
