= Karkikhan =

Village in Lorestan province, Iran

Karkikhan Persian: كركيخان
- Village
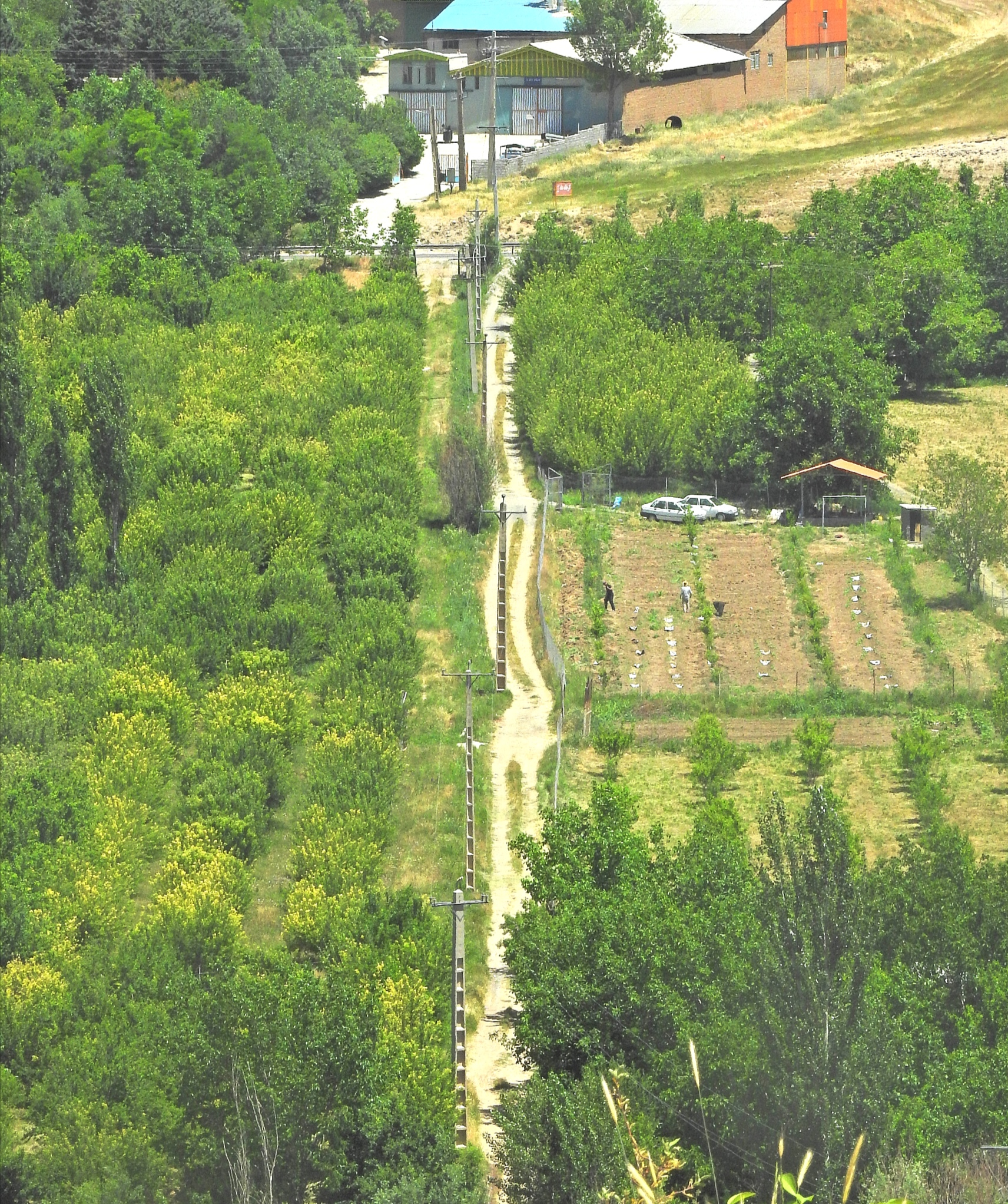
- Landscape in the village of Karkikhan

- Location within Iran
- Coordinates: 33°57′03″N 48°40′18″E
- Country: Iran
- Province: Lorestan
- County: Borujerd
- District: Oshtorinan
- Rural District: Gudarzi

Population (2016)
  - Total: 1,648
- Time zone: UTC+3:30 (IRST)

Karkikhan (Persian: كركيخان) (Note: Also romanized as Karkīkhān; also known as Karkīn Khān) is a village in Gudarzi Rural District of Oshtorinan District (Note: Formerly Ashtad District) in Borujerd County, Lorestan province, Iran.

== Demographics ==
=== Population ===
At the time of the 2006 National Census, the village's population was 1,713 in 440 households. The following census in 2011 counted 1,679 people in 500 households. The 2016 census measured the population of the village as 1,648 people in 540 households.
