= Deh-e Torkan, Lorestan =

Village in Lorestan province, Iran

Deh-e Torkan Persian: ده تركان
- Village
- Location within Iran
- Coordinates: 33°59′32″N 48°42′39″E
- Country: Iran
- Province: Lorestan
- County: Borujerd
- District: Oshtorinan
- Rural District: Oshtorinan

Population (2016)
  - Total: 891
- Time zone: UTC+3:30 (IRST)

Deh-e Torkan (Persian: ده تركان) (Note: Also romanized as Deh Torkān and Deh-e Torkān; also known as Tīţar Khān) is a village in Oshtorinan Rural District of Oshtorinan District (Note: Formerly Ashtad District) in Borujerd County, Lorestan province, Iran.

== Demographics ==
=== Population ===
At the time of the 2006 National Census, the village's population was 1,202 in 268 households. The following census in 2011 counted 1,153 people in 315 households. The 2016 census measured the population of the village as 891 people in 274 households.
