= Chaqabol, Borujerd =

Village in Lorestan province, Iran

Chaqabol Persian: چقابل
- Village
- Location within Iran
- Coordinates: 34°00′51″N 48°30′32″E
- Country: Iran
- Province: Lorestan
- County: Borujerd
- District: Oshtorinan
- Rural District: Bardesareh

Population (2016)
  - Total: 0
- Time zone: UTC+3:30 (IRST)

Chaqabol (Persian: چقابل) (Note: Also romanized as Chaqābal, Chaqābol, Choqā Bol, and Choqābal; also known as Chagawal, Chaghābal, Chaqāvol, Chaqāwal, Choghābal, and Choghaval) is a village in Bardesareh Rural District of Oshtorinan District (Note: Formerly Ashtad District) in Borujerd County, Lorestan province, Iran.

== Demographics ==
=== Population ===
At the time of the 2006 National Census, the village's population was 24 in six households. The 2016 census measured the population of the village as zero.
