= Angoshteh =

Village in Lorestan province, Iran

Angoshteh Persian: انگشته
- Village
- Location within Iran
- Coordinates: 34°05′29″N 48°32′24″E
- Country: Iran
- Province: Lorestan
- County: Borujerd
- District: Oshtorinan
- Rural District: Bardesareh

Population (2016)
  - Total: 192
- Time zone: UTC+3:30 (IRST)

Angoshteh (Persian: انگشته) (Note: Also romanized as Āngoshteh) is a village in Bardesareh Rural District of Oshtorinan District (Note: Formerly Ashtad District) in Borujerd County, Lorestan province, Iran.

== Demographics ==
=== Population ===
At the time of the 2006 National Census, the village's population was 410 in 87 households. The following census in 2011 counted 294 people in 81 households. The 2016 census measured the population of the village as 192 people in 66 households.
