= Amirabad, Borujerd =

Village in Lorestan province, Iran

Amirabad Persian: اميراباد
- Village
- Location within Iran
- Coordinates: 33°57′58″N 48°36′34″E
- Country: Iran
- Province: Lorestan
- County: Borujerd
- District: Oshtorinan
- Rural District: Gudarzi

Population (2016)
  - Total: 140
- Time zone: UTC+3:30 (IRST)

Amirabad (Persian: اميراباد) (Note: Also romanized as Amīrābād; also known as Amīrābād-e Gūdarzī) is a village in Gudarzi Rural District of Oshtorinan District (Note: Formerly Ashtad District) in Borujerd County, Lorestan province, Iran.

== Demographics ==
=== Population ===
At the time of the 2006 National Census, the village's population was 157 in 43 households. The following census in 2011 counted 117 people in 39 households. The 2016 census measured the population of the village as 140 people in 44 households.
