= Qaid Taher =

Village in Lorestan province, Iran

Qaid Taher Persian: قايدطاهر
- Village
- Location within Iran
- Coordinates: 34°00′05″N 48°35′36″E
- Country: Iran
- Province: Lorestan
- County: Borujerd
- District: Oshtorinan
- Rural District: Gudarzi

Population (2016)
  - Total: 1,677
- Time zone: UTC+3:30 (IRST)

Qaid Taher (Persian: قايدطاهر) (Note: Also romanized as Qā’īd Ţāher; also known as Qaed Taher and Qā’ed Ţāher) is a village in Gudarzi Rural District of Oshtorinan District (Note: Formerly Ashtad District) in Borujerd County, Lorestan province, Iran. It was the capital of Bardesareh Rural District until its capital was transferred to the village of Jafarabad.

== Demographics ==
=== Population ===
At the time of the 2006 National Census, the village's population was 1,945 in 533 households. The following census in 2011 counted 1,659 people in 507 households. The 2016 census measured the population of the village as 1,677 people in 545 households.
