= Deh Riz =

Village in Lorestan province, Iran

Deh Riz Persian: دهريز
- Village
- Location within Iran
- Coordinates: 34°04′52″N 48°37′45″E
- Country: Iran
- Province: Lorestan
- County: Borujerd
- District: Oshtorinan
- Rural District: Bardesareh

Population (2016)
  - Total: 1,479
- Time zone: UTC+3:30 (IRST)

Deh Riz (Persian: دهريز) (Note: Also romanized as Deh Rīz; also known as Dehraz and Deīrīz) is a village in Bardesareh Rural District of Oshtorinan District (Note: Formerly Ashtad District) in Borujerd County, Lorestan province, Iran.

== Demographics ==
=== Population ===
At the time of the 2006 National Census, the village's population was 1,549 in 371 households. The following census in 2011 counted 1,543 people in 433 households. The 2016 census measured the population of the village as 1,479 people in 436 households.
