= Rezaabad, Oshtorinan =

Village in Lorestan province, Iran

Rezaabad Persian: رضااباد
- Village
- Location within Iran
- Coordinates: 34°03′48″N 48°37′30″E
- Country: Iran
- Province: Lorestan
- County: Borujerd
- District: Oshtorinan
- Rural District: Bardesareh

Population (2016)
  - Total: 351
- Time zone: UTC+3:30 (IRST)

Rezaabad (Persian: رضااباد) (Note: Also romanized as Reẕāābād and Rezāābād) is a village in Bardesareh Rural District of Oshtorinan District (Note: Formerly Ashtad District) in Borujerd County, Lorestan province, Iran.

== Demographics ==
=== Population ===
At the time of the 2006 National Census, the village's population was 413 in 107 households. The following census in 2011 counted 358 people in 94 households. The 2016 census measured the population of the village as 351 people in 111 households.
