= Tudeh Zan =

Village in Lorestan province, Iran

Tudeh Zan Persian: توده زن
- Village
- Location within Iran
- Coordinates: 33°57′44″N 48°35′46″E
- Country: Iran
- Province: Lorestan
- County: Borujerd
- District: Oshtorinan
- Rural District: Gudarzi

Population (2016)
  - Total: 1,915
- Time zone: UTC+3:30 (IRST)

Tudeh Zan (Persian: توده زن) (Note: Also romanized as Tūdeh Zan; also known as Tūzāzan) is a village in Gudarzi Rural District of Oshtorinan District (Note: Formerly Ashtad District) in Borujerd County, Lorestan province, Iran.

== Demographics ==
=== Population ===
At the time of the 2006 National Census, the village's population was 1,862 in 490 households. The following census in 2011 counted 1,970 people in 527 households. The 2016 census measured the population of the village as 1,915 people in 587 households.
