= Malmijan =

Village in Lorestan province, Iran

Malmijan Persian: ملميجان
- Village
- Location within Iran
- Coordinates: 33°59′39″N 48°38′48″E
- Country: Iran
- Province: Lorestan
- County: Borujerd
- District: Oshtorinan
- Rural District: Gudarzi

Population (2016)
  - Total: 620
- Time zone: UTC+3:30 (IRST)

Malmijan (Persian: ملميجان) (Note: Also romanized as Malmījān; also known as Mālīān and Malmīyān) is a village in Gudarzi Rural District of Oshtorinan District (Note: Formerly Ashtad District) in Borujerd County, Lorestan province, Iran.

== Demographics ==
=== Population ===
At the time of the 2006 National Census, the village's population was 705 in 212 households. The following census in 2011 counted 574 people in 192 households. The 2016 census measured the population of the village as 620 people in 223 households.
