= Barakatabad, Lorestan =

Village in Lorestan province, Iran

Barakatabad Persian: بركت اباد
- Village
- Location within Iran
- Coordinates: 33°56′11″N 48°37′56″E
- Country: Iran
- Province: Lorestan
- County: Borujerd
- District: Oshtorinan
- Rural District: Gudarzi

Population (2016)
  - Total: 1,021
- Time zone: UTC+3:30 (IRST)

Barakatabad (Persian: بركت اباد) (Note: Also romanized as Barakatābād) is a village in Gudarzi Rural District of Oshtorinan District (Note: Formerly Ashtad District) in Borujerd County, Lorestan province, Iran.

== Demographics ==
=== Population ===
At the time of the 2006 National Census, the village's population was 817 in 203 households. The following census in 2011 counted 962 people in 275 households. The 2016 census measured the population of the village as 1,021 people in 298 households.
