= Darreh Garm, Borujerd =

Darreh Garm دره گرم
- Village
- Location within Iran
- Coordinates: 33°59′34″N 48°44′54″E
- Country: Iran
- Province: Lorestan
- County: Borujerd
- Bakhsh: Oshtorinan
- Rural District: Oshtorinan

Population (2006)
  - Total: 176
- Time zone: UTC+3:30 (IRST)
  - Summer (DST): UTC+4:30 (IRDT)

Darreh Garm (Persian: دره گرم, also Romanized as Darreh Garam) is a village in Oshtorinan Rural District, Oshtorinan District, Borujerd County, Lorestan Province, Iran. At the 2006 census, its population was 176, in 64 families.
