= Beyatan, Borujerd =

Village in Lorestan province, Iran

Beyatan Persian: بياتان
- Village
- Location within Iran
- Coordinates: 34°05′12″N 48°43′09″E
- Country: Iran
- Province: Lorestan
- County: Borujerd
- District: Oshtorinan
- Rural District: Oshtorinan

Population (2016)
  - Total: 212
- Time zone: UTC+3:30 (IRST)

Beyatan (Persian: بياتان) (Note: Also romanized as Beyātān; also known as Bayātān) is a village in Oshtorinan Rural District of Oshtorinan District (Note: Formerly Ashtad District) in Borujerd County, Lorestan province, Iran.

== Demographics ==
=== Population ===
At the time of the 2006 National Census, the village's population was 277 in 79 households. The following census in 2011 counted 218 people in 71 households. The 2016 census measured the population of the village as 212 people in 73 households.
