= Deh-e Yusef Ali =

Village in Lorestan province, Iran

Deh-e Yusef Ali Persian: ده يوسفعلي
- Village
- Location within Iran
- Coordinates: 34°04′44″N 48°42′04″E
- Country: Iran
- Province: Lorestan
- County: Borujerd
- District: Oshtorinan
- Rural District: Oshtorinan

Population (2016)
  - Total: 250
- Time zone: UTC+3:30 (IRST)

Deh-e Yusef Ali (Persian: ده يوسفعلي) (Note: Also romanized as Deh Yoosef Ali, Deh Yūsef ‘Alī, Deh Yūsof ‘Alī, Deh-e Yūsef ‘Alī, Deh-e Yusof Ali, and Deh-e Yūsof ‘Alī; also known as Deh Yūsef and Yūsef ‘Alī) is a village in Oshtorinan Rural District of Oshtorinan District (Note: Formerly Ashtad District) in Borujerd County, Lorestan province, Iran.

== Demographics ==
=== Population ===
At the time of the 2006 National Census, the village's population was 262 in 69 households. The following census in 2011 counted 231 people in 65 households. The 2016 census measured the population of the village as 250 people in 78 households.
