= Shab Mah =

Village in Lorestan province, Iran

Shab Mah Persian: شب ماه
- Village
- Location within Iran
- Coordinates: 34°00′12″N 48°33′07″E
- Country: Iran
- Province: Lorestan
- County: Borujerd
- District: Oshtorinan
- Rural District: Bardesareh

Population (2016)
  - Total: 536
- Time zone: UTC+3:30 (IRST)

Shab Mah (Persian: شب ماه) (Note: Also romanized as Shab Māh) is a village in Bardesareh Rural District of Oshtorinan District (Note: Formerly Ashtad District) in Borujerd County, Lorestan province, Iran.

== Demographics ==
=== Population ===
At the time of the 2006 National Census, the village's population was 635 in 138 households. The following census in 2011 counted 630 people in 159 households. The 2016 census measured the population of the village as 536 people in 138 households.
