= Borujerd rug =

Type of Rug

Borujerd rugs (Persian: قالی بروجرد qaliye borujerd) is a type of Persian rug woven in Borujerd, Western Iran. Borujerd rugs are different from Luri rugs as well as rugs of Arak and Central Iran. However, they have more features similar to rugs of Hamadan province.

Borujerd rugs are often produced in small (one to two square meters) using local wool and natural colors. Families in the city of Borujerd and its surrounding villages are involved in producing hand-made rugs and carpets.

After establishment of the British-Switzerland company Ziegler & Co. in Sultanabad (Arak) in 1883, this company showed interest in Borujerd rugs because of close distance as well as the quality and durability of Borujerdi rugs. The company also had a large-scale trade with Borujerd for supplying quality natural wool and colors from Borujerd.

Borujerd rug is mostly woven by rural families in Oshtorinan in north and in Silakhor in south of Borujerd County rather than the city of Borujerd.
