= Bardeh Sareh =

Village in Lorestan province, Iran

Bardeh Sareh Persian: برده سره
- Village
- Location within Iran
- Coordinates: 34°03′32″N 48°35′45″E
- Country: Iran
- Province: Lorestan
- County: Borujerd
- District: Oshtorinan
- Rural District: Bardesareh

Population (2016)
  - Total: 790
- Time zone: UTC+3:30 (IRST)

Bardeh Sareh (Persian: برده سره) (Note: Also known as Bard Sareh, Bard-e Sareh, and Bardeh Sar) is a village in Bardesareh Rural District of Oshtorinan District (Note: Formerly Ashtad District) in Borujerd County, Lorestan province, Iran.

== Demographics ==
=== Population ===
At the time of the 2006 National Census, the village's population was 777 in 188 households. The following census in 2011 counted 755 people in 228 households. The 2016 census measured the population of the village as 790 people in 243 households.
