= Mohammad Boroujerdi =

Iranian military commander (1944–1983)

Sardar Mohammad Boroujerdi
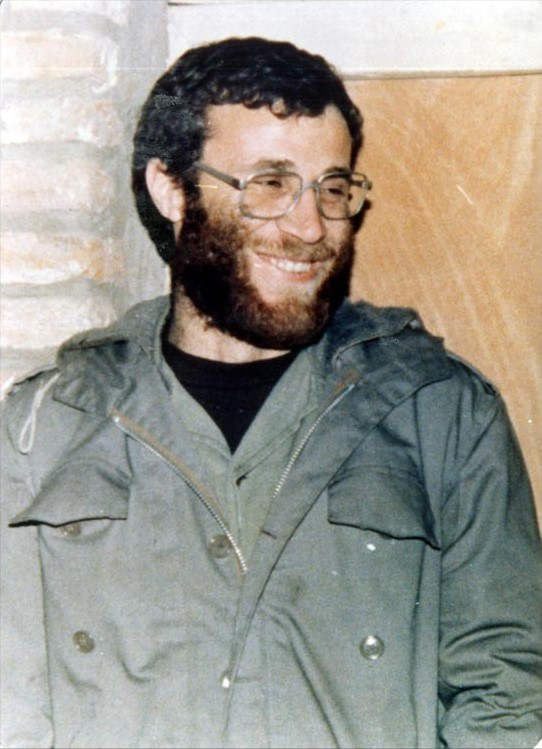
- Born: 21 March 1954; Darreh Gorg, Lorestan province, Imperial State of Iran
- Died: 22 May 1983 (aged 29); Naqadeh–Mahabad road, West Azerbaijan province, Islamic Republic of Iran
- Military career
- Allegiance: Pahlavi Iran; Tawhidi Saff Group (1975–1979); Mojahedin (1979); Iran (1979–1983)
- Branch: Imperial Iranian Ground Force; Islamic Revolutionary Guard Corps
- Service years: 1972–1974; 1975–1979; 1979–1983
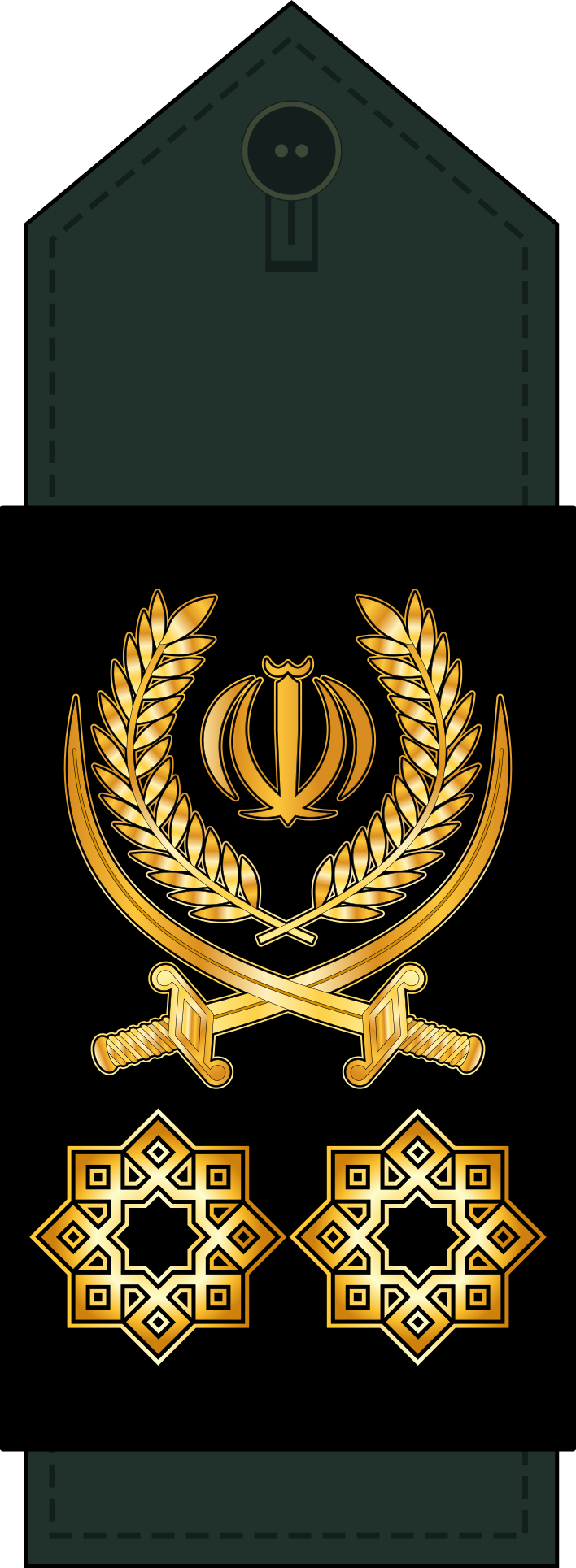
- Rank: Major General (posthumously)
- Nickname: Messiah of Kurdistan
- Unit: Muslim Peshmerga
- Commands: Deputy Commander of the Hamzeh Seyyed ol-Shohada Headquarters (1982–1983); Seventh Region of the Islamic Revolutionary Guard Corps (1981–1982); Islamic Revolutionary Guard Corps of Kurdistan province (1979)
- Conflicts: Iranian Revolution; 1979 Kurdish rebellion; Iran–Iraq War †

Mohammad Boroujerdi (Persian: محمد بروجردی; 21 March 1954 – 22 May 1983) was an Iranian commander in the Islamic Revolutionary Guard Corps during the Iran–Iraq War. He was also the commander of the Muslim Peshmerga and played a major role in restoring Iranian control over the territories of Kurdistan.

== Biography ==
Mohammad Borujerdi was a Shia Muslim of Kurdish descent, born around 1954, in the village of Darreh Gorg, in Borujerd County, and had five other siblings who nicknamed him "Mirza". When Boroujerdi was six years old, his father unexpectedly died and his family went into poverty, after which his mother relocated herself and her six children to Tehran in the neighborhood called Molavi. According to his mother, at seven years old, Boroujerdi began worked in a tailoring shop during the day and studied at a night school. At 14, he enrolled in a Quran school. Some time later, he joined the Islamic Coalition Party. He got married in 1971 and was called up for military service a year later, although he escaped from military service to meet with Ruhollah Khomeini but was arrested by SAVAK on the Iran–Iraq border in Khuzestan, and imprisoned at a SAVAK facility in Susangerd where he was hung upside down and beaten. He was released after six months and was forced to complete his military service in Tehran.

After his military service, he continued his anti-government activities, spending his time printing propaganda posters, and started seeking contacts. He came into contact with Mehdi Araghi and established the "Tawhidi Saff Group", an armed group intended to overthrow Mohammad Reza Pahlavi, in 1977. The same year, he went to Syria to receive guerrilla training from the Amal Movement, planning to wage war against the Pahlavi monarchy. He wanted to enter Najaf to meet with Ruhollah Khomeini but did not go as a result of the 1975 Algiers Agreement, choosing to return to Iran instead. He later complained about the communist tendencies of Lebanese and Palestinian groups in Syria. After the 1978 Qom protest, his anti-government stance intensified, and he was later connected to the explosion of the Khansalar restaurant in Tehran, the explosion of a military bus carrying American advisors in Lavizan, the disarmament of the officers at the police headquarters in Tehran, and a series of armed attacks on SAVAK centers.

When Ruhollah Khomeini returned to Iran, a group of his associates, including Morteza Motahhari, Mohammad Beheshti, and Mehdi Araghi, held a meeting and entrusted two militant groups, the "Tawhidi Saff Group" and the "Fajr al-Islam", led by Boroujerdi and Araghi, with protecting Khomeini. Boroujerdi and his associates offered security to Khomeini at the Mehrabad International Airport, around Behesht-e Zahra, and at the Alavi School. He also formed a unit to protect the residence of Khomeini in Tehran. When the violent stages of the Iranian Revolution began in February 1979, Boroujerdi was connected to the capturing the Jamshidiyye military garrison and the radio and television centers from the Immortal Guard. He was shot in the leg during the conflict but saw the success of the revolution. Immediately after, he was briefly put in charge of Evin Prison, which became filled with former Pahlavi government officials. He was also one of the twelve founders of the Islamic Revolutionary Guard Corps. Earlier during the revolution, he merged his group, Tawhidi Saff, with several others to form the Mojahedin of the Islamic Revolution Organization.

Boroujerdi as a commander in the Islamic Revolutionary Guard Corps during the Iran–Iraq War.

He was put in charge of the Vali-ye Asr military garrison. As the conflict intensified with the Kurdish groups such as KDPI, Komala, Feda'iyan, or Peykar, Boroujerdi was aged 25 when he was sent to Kermanshah and from there to Sanandaj. He sought to win the support of the Kurdish locals, who he viewed as simple people exploited by the rebel groups, and he was known for respecting the people of Kurdistan, who also had relatively good relations with him. Boroujerdi was nicknamed the "Messiah of Kurdistan". He also formulated the plan to establish the Muslim Peshmerga, and presented it to the Iranian government, which approved it and assigned him as the commander. With the beginning of the Iran–Iraq War, he went to Sarpol-e Zahab and almost died several times, with his hand severely injured, but consolidated control over the city. Despite his familiarity with Kurdistan, he also fought in Khuzestan in Tariq-ol-Qods and Fath-ol-Mobin. After the IRGC structure was divided into separate regions across Iran, he was given command of the IRGC 7th region, comprising the provinces of Kermanshah, Kurdistan, Ilam, and Hamadan. He also proposed the establishment of the Hamzeh Seyyed-ol-Shohada Base, an independent joint operations center for Army and IRGC forces in western Iran, which was approved and built in Urmia. He also established a special forces unit. Boroujerdi died on May 22, 1983, with several other Iranian soldiers, on the road from Naqadeh to Mahabad, after their vehicle drove over a landmine. Iranian sources attributed Boroujerdi's death to a landmine left by “anti-revolutionary” forces in Iranian Kurdistan.

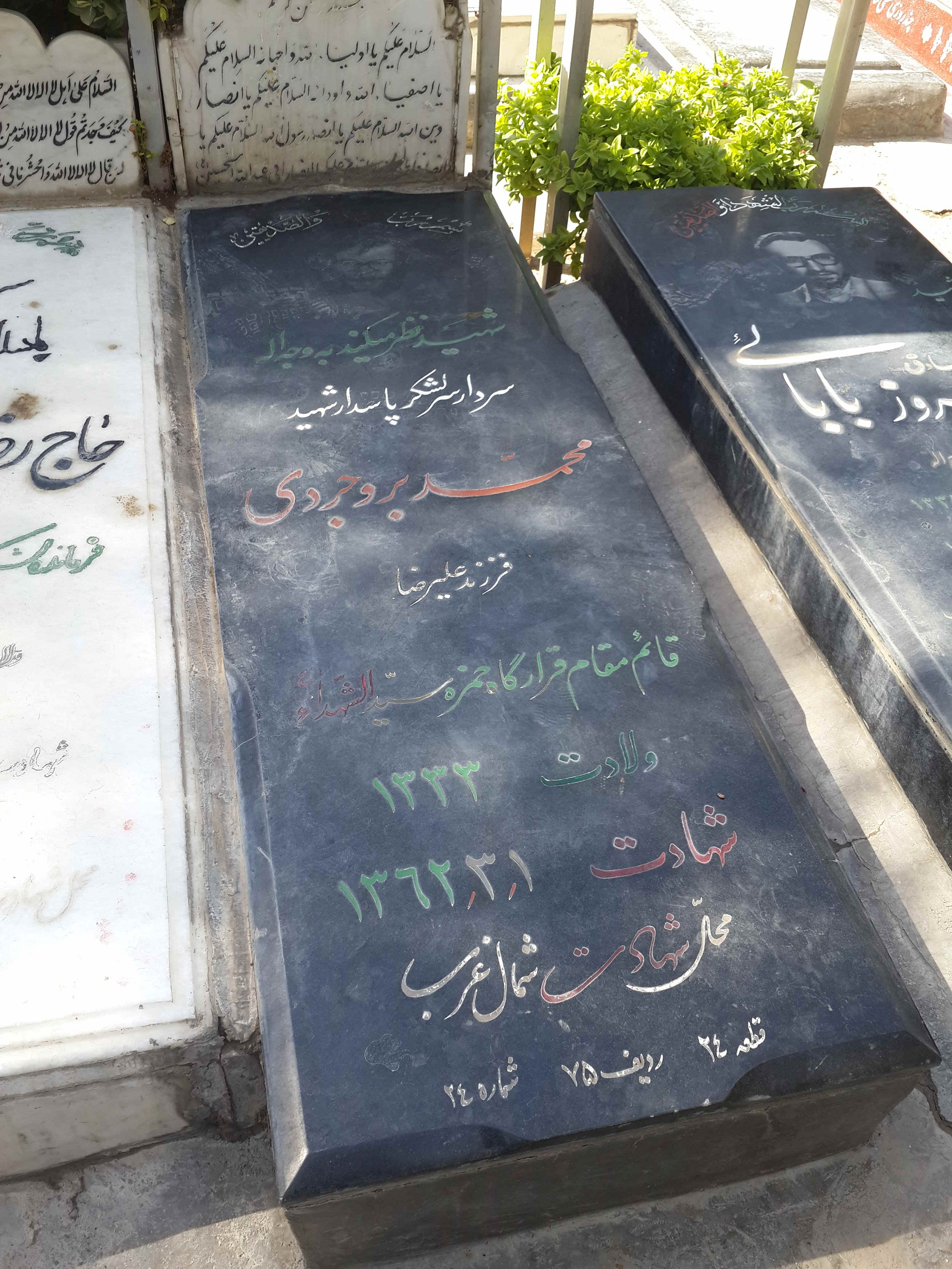
Grave of Mohammad Boroujerdi at the Behesht-e Zahra

== See also ==
- Iranian leaders of the Iran–Iraq War

Military offices
New title	Commander of the Islamic Revolutionary Guard Corps of Kurdistan province 1979	Succeeded by Davoud Karimi
New title	Commander of the Seventh Region of the Islamic Revolutionary Guard Corps; 1981–1982	Succeeded by Davoud Karimi
New title	Deputy Commander of the Hamzeh Seyyed ol-Shohada Headquarters; 1982–1983	Succeeded by ?
