= Jujeh Heydar =

Village in Lorestan province, Iran

Jujeh Heydar Persian: جوجه حيدر
- Village
- Location within Iran
- Coordinates: 34°01′05″N 48°32′38″E
- Country: Iran
- Province: Lorestan
- County: Borujerd
- District: Oshtorinan
- Rural District: Bardesareh

Population (2016)
  - Total: 916
- Time zone: UTC+3:30 (IRST)

Jujeh Heydar (Persian: جوجه حيدر) (Note: Also romanized as Jūjeh Ḩeydar; also known as Chakwal, Chūval, and Jūjeh Haidar) is a village in Bardesareh Rural District of Oshtorinan District (Note: Formerly Ashtad District) in Borujerd County, Lorestan province, Iran.

== Demographics ==
=== Population ===
At the time of the 2006 National Census, the village's population was 869 in 182 households. The following census in 2011 counted 743 people in 200 households. The 2016 census measured the population of the village as 916 people in 251 households.
