= Gondal Gilan =

Village in Lorestan province, Iran

Gondal Gilan Persian: گندل گيلان
- Village
- Location within Iran
- Coordinates: 33°57′50″N 48°44′52″E
- Country: Iran
- Province: Lorestan
- County: Borujerd
- District: Oshtorinan
- Rural District: Oshtorinan

Population (2016)
  - Total: 243
- Time zone: UTC+3:30 (IRST)

Gondal Gilan (Persian: گندل گيلان) (Note: Also romanized as Gandal Gīlān and Gondal Gīlān) is a village in Oshtorinan Rural District of Oshtorinan District (Note: Formerly Ashtad District) in Borujerd County, Lorestan province, Iran.

== Demographics ==
=== Population ===
At the time of the 2006 National Census, the village's population was 373 in 90 households. The following census in 2011 counted 287 people in 88 households. The 2016 census measured the population of the village as 243 people in 82 households.
