= Vanai, Lorestan =

City in Lorestan province, Iran

Vanai Persian: ونايي
- City
- Location within Iran
- Coordinates: 33°54′51″N 48°35′29″E
- Country: Iran
- Province: Lorestan
- County: Borujerd
- District: Oshtorinan

Population (2016)
  - Total: 4,862
- Time zone: UTC+3:30 (IRST)

Vanai (Persian: ونايي) (Note: Also romanized as Vanā’ī, Vannā’ī, Vennā’ī, and Vennai) is a city in Oshtorinan District (Note: Formerly Ashtad District) of Borujerd County, Lorestan province, Iran.

== Demographics ==
=== Population ===
At the time of the 2006 National Census, Vanai's population was 4,649 in 1,205 households, when it was a village in Gudarzi Rural District. The following census in 2011 counted 4,968 people in 1,373 households. The 2016 census measured the population of the village as 4,862 people in 1,573 households, the most populous in its rural district.

The village of Vanai was converted to a city in 2019.
