= Shahrak-e Shahid Mohammad-e Borujerdi =

Village in Lorestan province, Iran

Shahrak-e Shahid Mohammad-e Borujerdi Persian: شهرک شهيد محمد بروجردي
- Village
- Location within Iran
- Coordinates: 34°03′17″N 48°43′21″E
- Country: Iran
- Province: Lorestan
- County: Borujerd
- District: Oshtorinan
- Rural District: Oshtorinan

Population (2016)
  - Total: 1,200
- Time zone: UTC+3:30 (IRST)

Shahrak-e Shahid Mohammad-e Borujerdi (Persian: شهرک شهيد محمد بروجردي) (Note: Also romanized as Shahrak-e Shahīd Moḩammad-e Borūjerdī; also known as Darreh Gerg (دره گرگ)) is a village in, and the capital of, Oshtorinan Rural District in Oshtorinan District (Note: Formerly Ashtad District) of Borujerd County, Lorestan province, Iran.

== Demographics ==
=== Population ===
At the time of the 2006 National Census, the village's population was 1,543 in 424 households. The following census in 2011 counted 1,302 people in 412 households. The 2016 census measured the population of the village as 1,200 people in 401 households, the most populous in its rural district.
