= Mohsen Khazaei =

Iranian correspondent

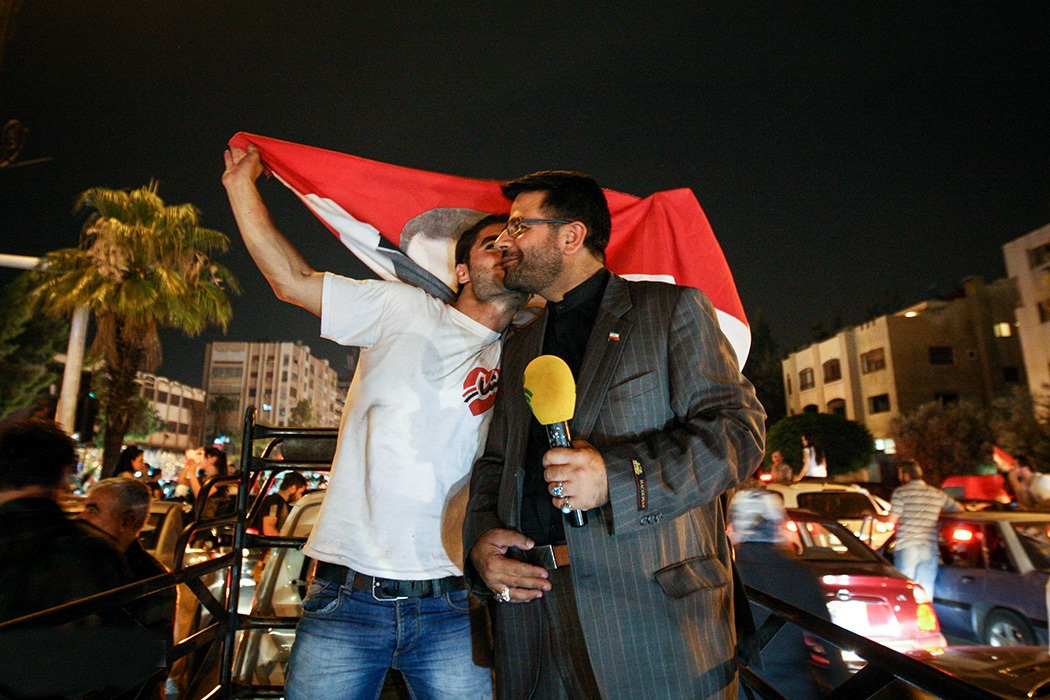
- Mohsen Khazaei reporting from Damascus
- Born: 6 December 1972 isfahan, Iran
- Died: 12 November 2016 (aged 43); Aleppo, Syria
- Education: State Administration Expert
- Occupations: Correspondent, Reporter
- Years active: 23 years of media activity in Iran
- Notable work: Installing the flag of Hazrat Zainab's Shrine
- Spouse: Maryam Rakhshani
- Children: Hadi, Mahdi, Zeinab
- Website: telegram.me/shahid_mohsen_khazaei

Mohsen Khazaei (Persian: محسن خزایی) was an Iranian correspondent.

== Biography ==
Mohsen Khazaei was born in December 6, 1972 in Isfahan. In 1995 he began his activities as a sound operator in TV and Radio. In 2004, he became the director of the Young Journalists' Club of Zahedan. When he gained success in the management of the Young Journalists' Club of Zahedan, he was introduced as the news director of Gilan. He fathered three children.

== Death in crossfire while reporting ==
On November 12, 2016, while he was embedded with Iranian-back militias besieging Eastern Aleppo for Islamic Republic of Iran Broadcasting and Fars News Agency, Khazaei was struck by shrapnel from a rebel mortar blast. As news of his death was broadcast, many people and officials expressed their sorrow in Iran.

== See also ==
- Mahmoud Saremi
- Hassan Shemshadi
