= Mahmoud Saremi =

Iranian reporter killed by the Taliban in 1998

Mahmoud Saremi (c. 1968 – 8 August 1998) was an Iranian reporter, working for IRNA, as the news agency's head of office in Mazar-i-Sharif, Afghanistan. He was killed by the Taliban when they occupied the Iranian consulate in Mazar-i-Sharif, together with eight Iranian diplomats (see 1998 Iranian diplomats assassination in Afghanistan).

He was born in Chahar Bareh village near Borujerd in Lorestān Province. Saremi's date of death (17 Mordad in the Iranian calendar) is named National Journalists' Day in Iran. A boulevard in Tehran, in Ekbatan, is also named after Saremi.

== See also ==
- Hassan Shemshadi
- Mohsen Khazaei
