= Muslim Peshmerga =

Kurdish militia in Iran

Organization of Kurdish Muslim Peshmergas
- سازمان پیشمرگان کرد مسلمان
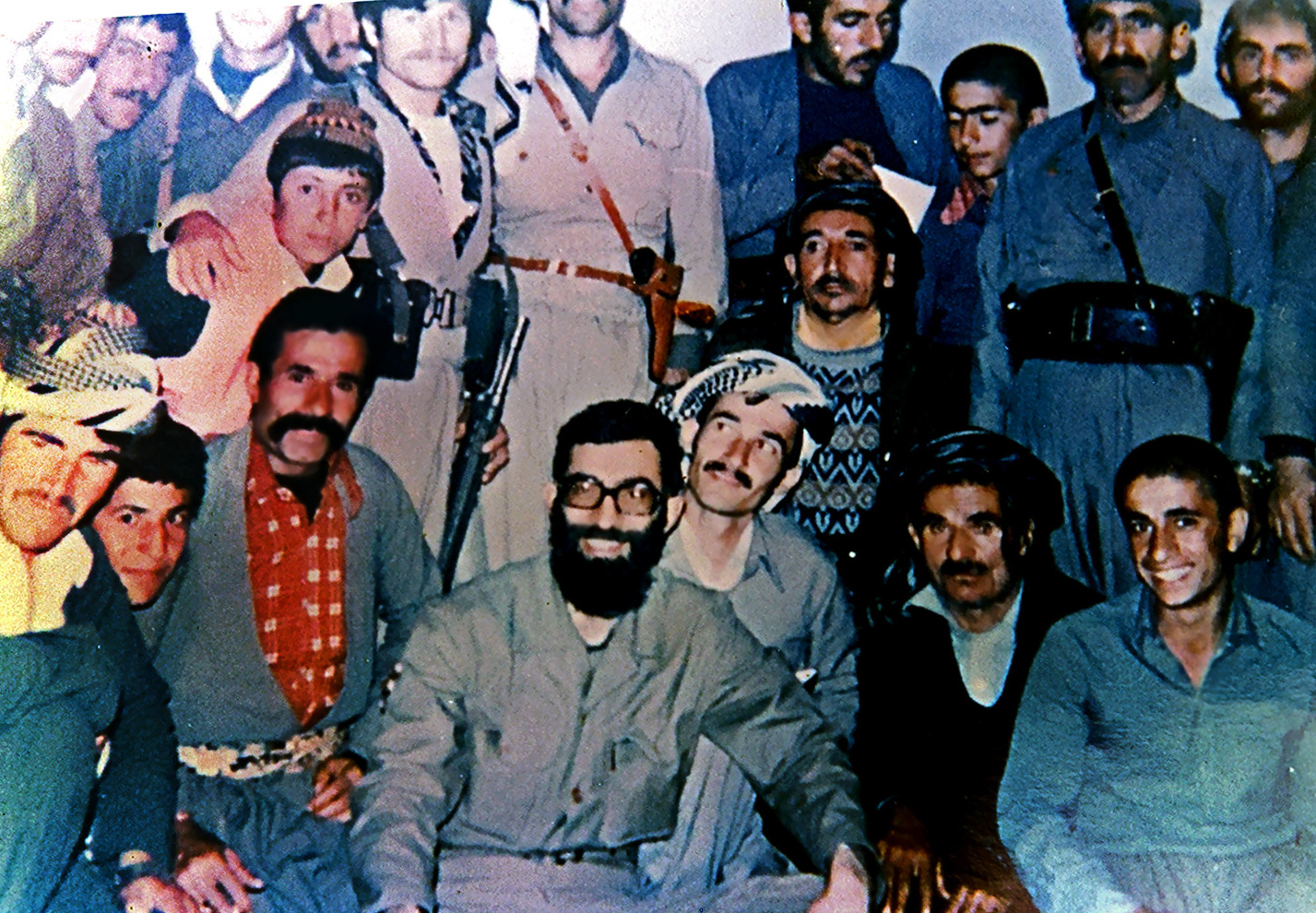
- Ali Khamenei with the Muslim Peshmerga in 1980
- Founding leader: Mohammad Boroujerdi
- Founded: 1979
- Country: Iran
- Active regions: Iranian Kurdistan
- Part of: Islamic Revolutionary Guard Corps
- Wars: 1979 Kurdish rebellion in Iran; Iran-Iraq war 2026 Kurdish–Iranian crisis

The Organization of Kurdish Muslim Peshmergas (Persian: سازمان پیشمرگان کرد مسلمان; Sāzmān-e Pīšmargān-e Kord-e Mosalmān), also known as the Muslim Peshmerga, or Islamic Peshmerga, is a militia group formed by the Islamic Revolutionary Guard Corps after the Iranian Revolution to recruit Kurds during the 1979 Kurdish revolts and the Iran–Iraq War. Initially an independent auxiliary force, the group was later incorporated into the Basij, with its more committed members being able to individually join the IRGC.

== History ==
The Iranian government formed the Muslim Peshmerga with the idea of partially acknowledging ethnic identity, while capitalizing on the anti-communist stance in traditional conservative Kurdish society. While intended to mostly recruit Sunni Kurds, most of its members were tribal mercenaries or Shia Kurds. There were reports that some of the group pledged allegiance to Ahmad Moftizadeh, although he disassociated from the group. The Iranian government also established the militia because it had no choice but to recruit local Kurds. Many of those who joined were formerly in the KDPI and Komala. The Muslim Peshmerga was seen as an attempt to divide the Kurds and create enemies within. Although the Kurdish tribes were drastically weakened by the policies of Mohammad Reza Pahlavi, the Islamic Republic promoted tribalism to weaken the Kurdish movement in the 1980s, by sponsoring and arming the tribes to fight the political groups. They were integrated into the security forces and trained by the IRGC.

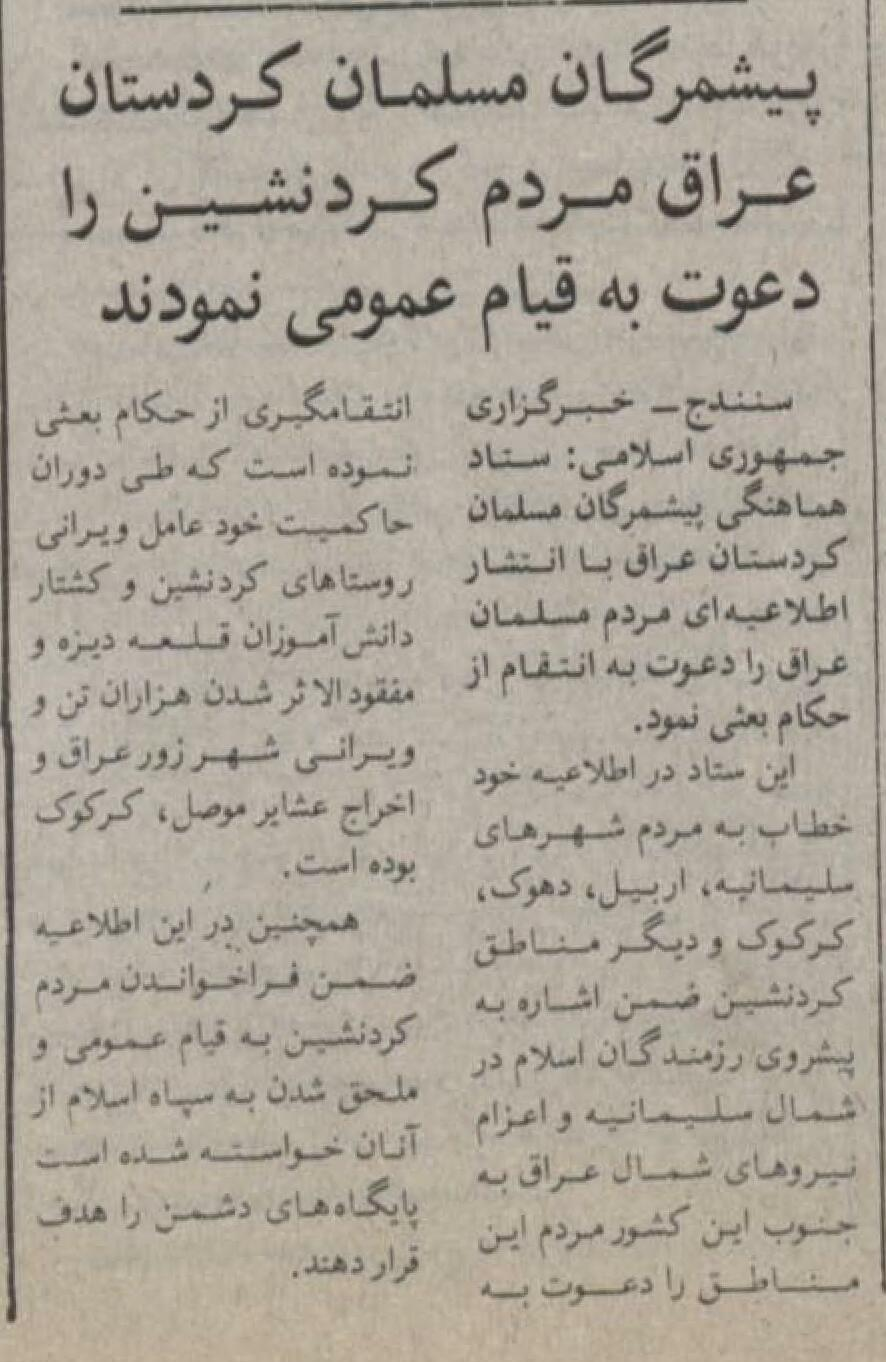
Muslim Peshmerga calling on Iraqi Kurds to rebel against Saddam Hussein

The concept of a local Kurdish militia independent from the IRGC and government institutions was supported by many in the Council of the Islamic Revolution, especially Ali Khamenei. With the formation of the Muslim Peshmerga in Kermanshah in 1979, other branches were organized in various other Kurdish cities such as Paveh, Javanrud, Kamyaran, and Marivan, and the group began recruiting locals. The fighting between Iran and the Kurdish separatists was at its highest intensity at the time the Muslim Peshmerga was founded. The Iranian government tried to gain as much support as possible from ethnic minorities by relying on various methods, among them were the formation of the Muslim Peshmerga, affiliated with the IRGC, and the recruitment of Kurds into the IRGC. The Iranian government also promoted Sunni-Shia brotherhood, including the idea of "Unity Week", formalized by the decrees of Hussein-Ali Montazeri and Ruhollah Khomeini, forming alliances with certain Sunni clerics. To gain support from the poor, they also gave charity through the Imam Khomeini Relief Foundation, Jihad of Construction, and rural and tribal cooperatives. The Muslim Peshmerga is divided across three major IRGC corps. Those in Urmia were part of the Hamzeh Seyyed ol-Shohada Corps, those in Sanandaj were part of the Beit-ol-Moqaddas Corps, and those in Kermanshah, as well as Ilam, were part of the Nabi Akram Corps. Some Peshmerga veterans under Mustafa Barzani, including Kurds from both Iran and Iraq, later joined the Muslim Peshmerga.

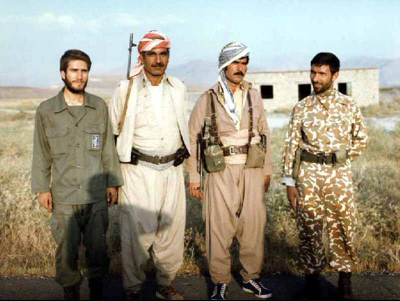
Ali Sayad Shirazi and Gholam-Ali Shahanaghi with two Muslim Peshmerga fighters

Kurdish tribes historically participated in many conflicts, and after the Iranian revolution, both the rebel groups and Iranian government attempted to recruit the tribes, although the tribal participation shifted in favor of the government through the Muslim Peshmerga, largely by the efforts of Mohammad Boroujerdi. By 1982, the Muslim Peshmerga captured most of Iranian Kurdistan from the rebel groups. The Muslim Peshmerga played a major role in the Iranian government retaking Kamyaran, Bayangan, Paveh, Nowdeshah, and other parts of Kurdistan. Iranian government forces, along with the Muslim Peshmerga and the KDP Peshmerga of Iraqi Kurdistan, cleared out the remaining Iraqi soldiers, KDPI, and Komala in Iranian Kurdistan. Iran began capturing parts of Iraqi Kurdistan with the help of the PUK Peshmerga, despite concerns over their secular and nationalist ideologies. In one of his speeches, Ruhollah Khomeini praised the Muslim Peshmerga and likened them to the companions of Muhammad.

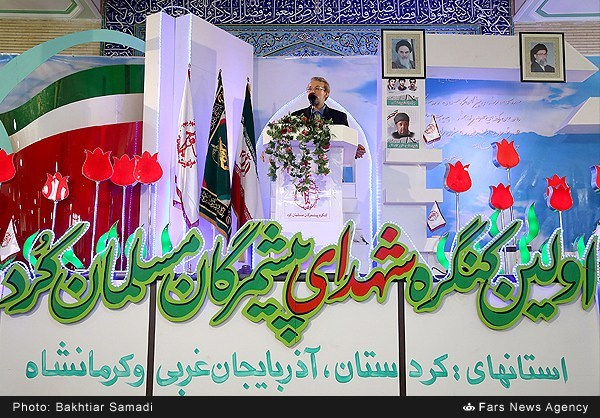
Ali Larijani speaking at the First Kurdish Muslim Peshmerga Martyrs Congress in 2015

During the 2026 Iran war, the Iranian government began reviving the Muslim Peshmerga. The Muslim Peshmerga mourned the death of Ali Khamenei, and threatened the "Israeli-American" militaries and the "deceived members of the counter-revolutionary groups" if the war spread to Iranian Kurdistan. It also claimed to have thousands of members ready to defend the western border. In June 2026, several members of the group were killed and wounded in attacks by Kurdish separatist groups.
