= Nabiabad, Lorestan =

Village in Lorestan province, Iran

Nabiabad Persian: نبي اباد
- Village
- Location within Iran
- Coordinates: 34°01′35″N 48°35′05″E
- Country: Iran
- Province: Lorestan
- County: Borujerd
- District: Oshtorinan
- Rural District: Bardesareh

Population (2016)
  - Total: 77
- Time zone: UTC+3:30 (IRST)

Nabiabad (Persian: نبي اباد) (Note: Also romanized as Nabīābād; also known as Naghi Abad) is a village in Bardesareh Rural District of Oshtorinan District (Note: Formerly Ashtad District) in Borujerd County, Lorestan province, Iran.

== Demographics ==
=== Population ===
At the time of the 2006 National Census, the village's population was 121 in 32 households. The following census in 2011 counted 94 people in 27 households. The 2016 census measured the population of the village as 77 people in 25 households.
