= 1998 killing of Iranian diplomats in Afghanistan =

Part of the Afghan Civil War (1996–2001)

- Part of the Battles of Mazar-i-Sharif
- Location: 36°42′N 67°07′E; Mazar-i-Sharif, Afghanistan
- Date: 8 August 1998 (UTC+04:30)
- Target: Iranian diplomats
- Deaths: 11 (incl. one journalist)
- Perpetrator: Taliban
- No. of participants: Sipah-e-Sahaba Pakistan (alleged)
- Motive: Iran's support for the anti-Taliban Northern Alliance during the Afghan Civil War

On 8 August 1998, amidst the Battles of Mazar-i-Sharif, the Iranian consulate in Mazar-i-Sharif was attacked as the Taliban were besieging the city. Initially, only the deaths of eight Iranian diplomats was reported, but two other diplomats and a journalist were later confirmed dead as well, bringing the total number of Iranians killed at the consulate to 11. During this time, Iran was supporting the anti-Taliban Northern Alliance, and the killings heightened direct military tensions along the Afghanistan–Iran border, which was controlled on the Afghan side by the Taliban's Islamic Emirate at the time.

== Background ==
Before this incident, Iran was supportive of the Afghan Northern Alliance, and the city of Mazar-i-Sharif was one of the headquarters of the alliance. It is reported that between May and July 1997 Abdul Malik Pahlawan executed thousands of Taliban prisoners as revenge for the 1995 death of Abdul Ali Mazari. "He is widely believed to have been responsible for the brutal massacre of up to 3,000 Taliban prisoners after inviting them into Mazar-i-Sharif." As revenge, Taliban forces captured Mazar-i-Sharif and killed hundreds of Northern Alliance members, particularly members of the Hazara and Uzbek ethnic groups as they were accused of being the ones who carried out the killings of Taliban prisoners.

== Incident ==
On 8 August 1998, Taliban forces captured Mazar-i-Sharif. After this incident, 11 Iranian diplomats and Mahmoud Saremi, a correspondent from Iran's state news agency (IRNA), were attacked at the Iranian consulate and subsequently disappeared. Unofficial reports from the city indicated that all these men were killed. Later it was confirmed that eight of the Iranian diplomats (Nasser Rigi, Noorollah Norouzi, Karim Heydarian, Rashid Paryav Fallah, Heydar-Ali Bagheri, Mohammad-Ali Ghiyasi, Majid Nouri Niyarki, and Mohammad-Nasser Naseri) and Saremi were killed.

== Perpetrators ==
The Taliban spokesmen said the Iranians had been killed by renegade forces who had acted without orders. The final death toll was confirmed later to be 11 according to Tehran Times. The executions of the diplomats are speculated to have been carried out by Sipah-e-Sahaba Pakistan. However, as of August 2025, Iran's Ministry of Foreign Affairs had not identified the "perpetrators and masterminds" of the deaths, stating "The matter remains under serious and active pursuit."

== Aftermath ==
Shortly after their deaths, Qasem Soleimani, the commander of the Quds Force, visited the families of the fallen.

The incident caused a public furor in Iran and many observers were concerned that Iran would be involved in a military response to the attack. At the time, over 70,000 Iranian troops were deployed along the Afghan border. Mediation by the United Nations defused the situation and all the hostages were eventually released. Later in February 1999, the Taliban and Iran held talks, but relations between them did not improve. Subsequently, Iran decided to support the Northern Alliance, an anti-Taliban front.

August 8 is named National Journalists' Day in Iran, in memory of Mahmoud Saremi, the IRNA correspondent killed in this attack.

== In popular culture ==
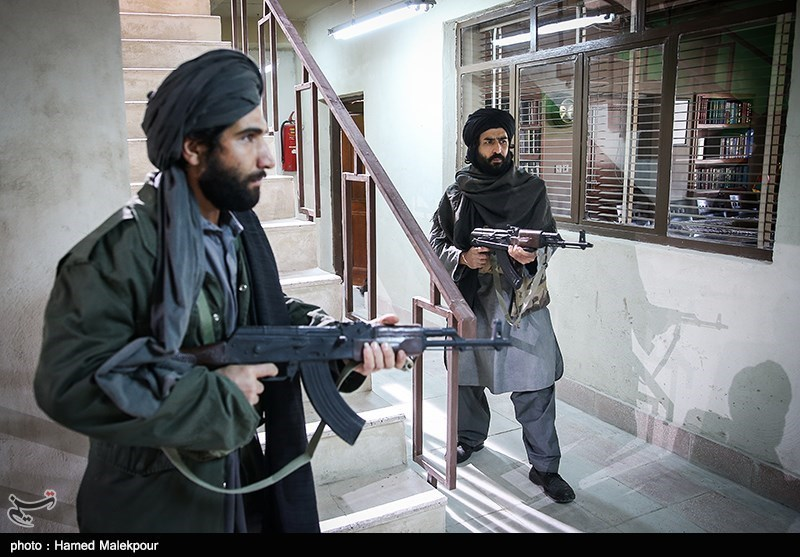
Actors portraying the attackers, from the 2015 Iranian film Mazar Sharif

An Iranian film Mazar Sharif was made on this story in 2015. Abdolhassan Barzideh was the director.

== See also ==
- 2018 attack on the Iranian Embassy in London
