= Gundalapadu =

- village
- Interactive map of Gundalapadu
- Location in Andhra Pradesh, India Gundalapadu (India)
- Coordinates: 16°18′2″N 80°10′11″E
- Country: India
- State: Andhra Pradesh
- District: Guntur

Population (2014)
  - Total: 3,500

Languages
  - Official: Telugu
- Time zone: UTC+5:30 (IST)
- PIN: 522549
- Vehicle registration: AP-07
- Nearest city: Sattenapalli
- Lok Sabha constituency: Guntur
- Assembly constituency: Tadikonda
- Climate: Tropical Wet and Dry (Köppen)
- Precipitation: 980 millimetres (39 in)
- Avg. summer temperature: 48 °C (118 °F)
- Avg. winter temperature: 16 °C (61 °F)
- Website: http://www.gundalapadu.com

Gundalapadu is a village in the Phirangipuram mandal of Guntur district, Andhra Pradesh, India. It is located approximately 35 kilometres from Guntur.

The villagers are mainly depends on cultivation and farming. There are many business people who are running businesses successfully.
