= Darreh Garm-e Chenar =

Darreh Garm-e Chenar دره گرم چنار
- Village
- Location within Iran
- Coordinates: 30°52′51″N 51°08′16″E
- Country: Iran
- Province: Kohgiluyeh and Boyer-Ahmad
- County: Dana
- Bakhsh: Kabgian
- Rural District: Chenar

Population (2006)
  - Total: 100
- Time zone: UTC+3:30 (IRST)
  - Summer (DST): UTC+4:30 (IRDT)

Darreh Garm-e Chenar (Persian: دره گرم چنار, also Romanized as Darreh Garm-e Chenār; also known as Darreh Garm and Darreh Garm-e Mīān Chenār) is a village in Chenar Rural District, Kabgian District, Dana County, Kohgiluyeh and Boyer-Ahmad Province, Iran. At the 2006 census, its population was 100, in 21 families.
