= Kushki Do =

Kushki Do کوشکی دو
- Village
- Location within Iran
- Coordinates: 32°45′00″N 48°15′36″E
- Country: Iran
- Province: Khuzestan
- County: Andimeshk
- Bakhsh: Alvar-e Garmsiri
- Rural District: Hoseyniyeh

Population (2006)
  - Total: 140
- Time zone: UTC+3:30 (IRST)
  - Summer (DST): UTC+4:30 (IRDT)

Kushki Do (Persian: کوشکی دو, also Romanized as Kūshkī Do; also known as Kūshkī) is a village in Hoseyniyeh Rural District, Alvar-e Garmsiri District, Andimeshk County, Khuzestan Province, Iran. At the 2006 census, its population was 140, in 29 different families.
