= Napiabad =

Napiabad نپي اباد
- Village
- Location within Iran
- Coordinates: 32°16′12″N 49°48′12″E
- Country: Iran
- Province: Khuzestan
- County: Andika
- Bakhsh: Chelo
- Rural District: Chelo

Population (2006)
  - Total: 147
- Time zone: UTC+3:30 (IRST)
  - Summer (DST): UTC+4:30 (IRDT)

Napiabad (Persian: نپي اباد, also Romanized as Napīābād; also known as Nabīābād) is a village in Chelo Rural District, Chelo District, Andika County, Khuzestan Province, Iran. At the 2006 census, its population was 147, in 24 families.
