= Darreh Garm, Sistan and Baluchestan =

Darreh Garm دره گرم
- Village
- Location within Iran
- Coordinates: 27°58′26″N 60°47′16″E
- Country: Iran
- Province: Sistan and Baluchestan
- County: Khash
- Bakhsh: Central
- Rural District: Karvandar

Population (2006)
  - Total: 43
- Time zone: UTC+3:30 (IRST)
  - Summer (DST): UTC+4:30 (IRDT)

Darreh Garm (Persian: دره گرم; also known as Bī Gol) is a village in Karvandar Rural District, in the Central District of Khash County, Sistan and Baluchestan Province, Iran. At the 2006 census, its population was 43, in 10 families.
