= Oshtorinan =

City in Lorestan province, Iran

Oshtorinan Persian: اشترينان
- City
- Location within Iran
- Coordinates: 34°01′00″N 48°38′35″E
- Country: Iran
- Province: Lorestan
- County: Borujerd
- District: Oshtorinan

Population (2016)
  - Total: 5,520
- Time zone: UTC+3:30 (IRST)

Oshtorinan (Persian: اشترينان) (Note: Also romanized as Oshtorīnān and Oŝtorinān; also known as Ashtarian, and Oshtornīān) is a city in, and the capital of, Oshtorinan District (Note: Formerly Ashtad District) of Borujerd County, Lorestan province, Iran.

== Demographics ==
=== Population ===
At the time of the 2006 National Census, the city's population was 5,264 in 1,408 households. The following census in 2011 counted 5,083 people in 1,543 households. The 2016 census measured the population of the city as 5,520 people in 1,768 households.
