= Gondal, Attock =

Town in Attock District, Punjab, Pakistan

Gondal
- Town
- Location within Pakistan
- Coordinates: 33°53′22″N 72°20′27″E
- Country: Pakistan
- Province: Punjab
- District: Attock
- Tehsil: Attock

Population (2017)
  - Total: 435,203 (Attock Tehsil population per 2,017 census)
- Time zone: UTC+5 (PST)

Gondal is a town in Attock District of Punjab Province in Pakistan on the N-5 National Highway Grand Trunk Road. Gondal is famous for weekly cattle market held every Monday.
