= Darreh Garm, Fars =

Darreh Garm دره گرم
- Village
- Location within Iran
- Coordinates: 30°11′54″N 51°41′46″E
- Country: Iran
- Province: Fars
- County: Mamasani
- Bakhsh: Central
- Rural District: Javid-e Mahuri

Population (2006)
  - Total: 63
- Time zone: UTC+3:30 (IRST)
  - Summer (DST): UTC+4:30 (IRDT)

Darreh Garm (Persian: دره گرم; also known as Bābā Pīrī-ye Darreh Garm, Bābā Pīr Pā‘īn, and Darreh Garm-e Aḩmad Hārūn) is a village in Javid-e Mahuri Rural District, in the Central District of Mamasani County, Fars province, Iran. At the 2006 census, its population was 63, in 11 families.
