= Gushki, Hormozgan =

Gushki گوشكي
- Village
- Location within Iran
- Coordinates: 26°21′20″N 57°18′07″E
- Country: Iran
- Province: Hormozgan
- County: Minab
- Bakhsh: Byaban
- Rural District: Byaban

Population (2006)
  - Total: 251
- Time zone: UTC+3:30 (IRST)
  - Summer (DST): UTC+4:30 (IRDT)

Gushki (Persian: گوشكي, also Romanized as Gūshkī; also known as Goshki, Kargūshkī, Qal‘eh-ye Gūshī, Qal‘eh-ye Gūshkī, and Qal‘eh-ye Kūshkī) is a village in Byaban Rural District, Byaban District, Minab County, Hormozgan Province, Iran. At the 2006 census, its population was 251, in 45 families.
