= Kushki-ye Bala =

Village in Lorestan province, Iran

Kushki-ye Bala Persian: کوشکي بالا
- Village
- Location within Iran
- Coordinates: 34°01′46″N 48°47′55″E
- Country: Iran
- Province: Lorestan
- County: Borujerd
- District: Oshtorinan
- Rural District: Oshtorinan

Population (2016)
  - Total: 364
- Time zone: UTC+3:30 (IRST)

Kushki-ye Bala (Persian: کوشکي بالا) (Note: Also romanized as Kūshkī-ye Bālā; formerly known as Kushki-ye Olya (كوشكي عليا), also romanized as Kūshkī-ye ‘Olyā; also known as Gūshkī, Gūshkī-ye Bālā, Gūshkī-ye ‘Olyā, and Kūshkī) is a village in Oshtorinan Rural District of Oshtorinan District (Note: Formerly Ashtad District) in Borujerd County, Lorestan province, Iran.

== Demographics ==
=== Population ===
At the time of the 2006 National Census, the village's population, as Kushki-ye Olya, was 417 in 109 households. The following census in 2011 counted 368 people in 115 households, by which time the village was listed as Kushki-ye Bala. The 2016 census measured the population of the village as 364 people in 110 households.
