= Kharkushi =

Kharkushi خركوشی
- Village
- Location within Iran
- Coordinates: 26°10′40″N 57°14′29″E
- Country: Iran
- Province: Hormozgan
- County: Minab
- Bakhsh: Byaban
- Rural District: Byaban

Population (2006)
  - Total: 773
- Time zone: UTC+3:30 (IRST)
  - Summer (DST): UTC+4:30 (IRDT)

Kharkushi (Persian: خركوشی, also Romanized as Kharkūshī; also known as Gūshkī, Kargūshkī, Kar Gūshkī, Khargūshī, and Kharguskki) is a village in Byaban Rural District, Byaban District, Minab County, Hormozgan Province, Iran. At the 2006 census, its population was 773, in 138 families.
