= Kushki-ye Pain =

Village in Lorestan province, Iran

Kushki-ye Pain Persian: کوشکي پايين
- Village
- Location within Iran
- Coordinates: 34°01′01″N 48°48′40″E
- Country: Iran
- Province: Lorestan
- County: Borujerd
- District: Oshtorinan
- Rural District: Oshtorinan

Population (2016)
  - Total: 226
- Time zone: UTC+3:30 (IRST)

Kushki-ye Pain (Persian: کوشکي پايين) (Note: Also romanized as Kushki-ye Pā’īn; formerly known as Kushki-ye Sofla (كوشكي سفلي), also romanized as Kūshkī-ye Soflá; also known as Gūshki, Gūshkī-ye Pā’īn, Gūshkī-ye Soflá, and Koshki) is a village in Oshtorinan Rural District of Oshtorinan District (Note: Formerly Ashtad District) in Borujerd County, Lorestan province, Iran.

== Demographics ==
=== Population ===
At the time of the 2006 National Census, the village's population, as Kushki-ye Sofla, was 368 in 86 households. The following census in 2011 counted 314 people in 82 households, by which time the village was listed as Kushki-ye Pain. The 2016 census measured the population of the village as 226 people in 70 households.
