= Gudarzi Rural District =

Rural district in Lorestan province, Iran

Gudarzi Rural District Persian: دهستان گودرزئ
- Rural District
- Location within Iran
- Coordinates: 33°56′N 48°36′E
- Country: Iran
- Province: Lorestan
- County: Borujerd
- District: Oshtorinan
- Established: 1990
- Capital: Bondizeh

Population (2016)
  - Total: 16,375
- Time zone: UTC+3:30 (IRST)

Gudarzi Rural District (Persian: دهستان گودرزئ) is in Oshtorinan District (Note: Formerly Ashtad District) of Borujerd County, Lorestan province, Iran. Its capital is the village of Bondizeh.

== Demographics ==
=== Population ===
At the time of the 2006 National Census, the rural district's population was 16,875 in 4,438 households. There were 16,321 inhabitants in 4,779 households at the following census of 2011. The 2016 census measured the population of the rural district as 16,375 in 5,223 households. The most populous of its 14 villages was Vanai (now a city), with 4,862 people.

=== Other villages in the rural district ===
- Amirabad
- Barakatabad
- Chahar Barreh
- Golchehran
- Kafshgaran
- Karkikhan
- Kheshtianak
- Malmijan
- Qaid Taher
- Takderakht
- Tudeh Zan
