= Gundala gondal =

Gundala
- village
- Country: India
- State: Gujarat
- District: Rajkot
- Taluka: Gondal
- Elevation: 141 m (463 ft)

Languages
  - Official: Gujarati, Hindi, English
- Time zone: UTC+5:30 (IST)
- PIN: 360311
- STD code: 02825

Gundala is a historical village since the princely state of Gondal.

Anida (4 km), Patidad (5 km), Chordi (5 km), Umvada Mota (6 km), Vorakotda (7 km) are the nearby villages to Gundala. Gundala is surrounded by Kotda Sangani Taluka towards the east, Lodhika Taluka towards the north, Jamkandorna Taluka towards the west, and Jetpur Taluka towards the south.

As per constitution of India and Panchyati Raaj Act, Gundala village is administrated by Sarpanch (Head of Village) who is elected representative of village.

== Hom in Gundala ==
- Gundala Kumar Primary School
