= Oshtorinan Rural District =

Rural district in Lorestan province, Iran

Oshtorinan Rural District Persian: دهستان اشترينان
- Rural District
- Location within Iran
- Coordinates: 34°02′N 48°44′E
- Country: Iran
- Province: Lorestan
- County: Borujerd
- District: Oshtorinan
- Established: 1987
- Capital: Shahrak-e Shahid Mohammad-e Borujerdi

Population (2016)
  - Total: 4,240
- Time zone: UTC+3:30 (IRST)

Oshtorinan Rural District (Persian: دهستان اشترينان) is in Oshtorinan District (Note: Formerly Ashtad District) of Borujerd County, Lorestan province, Iran. Its capital is the village of Shahrak-e Shahid Mohammad-e Borujerdi. (Note: Also known as Darreh Gerg)

== Demographics ==
=== Population ===
At the time of the 2006 National Census, the rural district's population was 5,699 in 1,503 households. There were 4,904 inhabitants in 1,492 households at the following census of 2011. The 2016 census measured the population of the rural district as 4,240 in 1,415 households. The most populous of its 20 villages was Shahrak-e Shahid Mohammad-e Borujerdi, with 1,200 people.

=== Other villages in the rural district ===
- Beyatan
- Deh-e Torkan
- Deh-e Yusef Ali
- Gondal Gilan
- Kushki-ye Bala
- Kushki-ye Pain
