= Oshtorinan District =

District in Lorestan province, Iran

Oshtorinan District Persian: بخش اشترینان
- District
- Location within Iran
- Coordinates: 34°00′N 48°40′E
- Country: Iran
- Province: Lorestan
- County: Borujerd
- Capital: Oshtorinan

Population (2016)
  - Total: 32,988
- Time zone: UTC+3:30 (IRST)

Oshtorinan District (Persian: بخش اشترینان), (Note: Formerly Ashtad District (بخش اشتاد)) is in Borujerd County, Lorestan province, Iran. Its capital is the city of Oshtorinan.

== History ==
The village of Vanai was converted to a city in 2019.

== Demographics ==
=== Population ===
At the time of the 2006 National Census, the district's population was 35,368 in 9,148 households. The following census in 2011 counted 33,478 people in 9,829 households. The 2016 census measured the population of the district as 32,988 inhabitants in 10,480 households.

=== Administrative divisions ===
Oshtorinan District Population
Administrative Divisions	2006	2011	2016
Bardesareh RD	7,530	7,170	6,853
Gudarzi RD	16,875	16,321	16,375
Oshtorinan RD	5,699	4,904	4,240
Oshtorinan (city)	5,264	5,083	5,520
Vanai (city) (Note: Became a city after the 2016 census)			
Total	35,368	33,478	32,988
RD = Rural District
