= Shaveh =

Shaveh or Shavah (Persian: شاوه) may refer to:

- Shaveh, Hamadan
- Shaveh, Markazi
- Shaveh-ye Abdollah-e Amuri
- Shaveh-ye Beyt Hamid
- Shaveh-ye Beyt Mansur
- Shaveh-ye Eyn-e Yebareh
- Shaveh-ye Marun-e Seh
- Shaveh-ye Mazzandeh
- Shaveh-ye Seyvan
- Shaveh-ye Ud-e Taqi

== See also ==
- Hesar-e Shaveh
