= Hoseyniyeh =

Hoseyniyeh or Hoseynieh (Persian: حسينيه) may refer to various places in Iran:

- Hoseyniyeh, Hormozgan
- Hoseyniyeh, Isfahan
- Hoseyniyeh, Khuzestan
- Hoseyniyeh, Markazi
- Hoseyniyeh-ye Khazir
- Hoseyniyeh-ye Mir Shenan
- Hoseyniyeh-ye Olya
- Hoseynieh-ye Sar Bardian
- Hoseyniyeh Rural District, in Khuzestan Province
- Qaleh-ye Hoseyniyeh

== See also ==
- Husayniyya (disambiguation)
