= Muilheh =

Muilheh or Moveylheh (Persian: مويلحه), also rendered as Molheh, may refer to:

- Muilheh-ye Olya
- Muilheh-ye Sofla
- Muilheh-ye Vosta
