= Alvan =

Alvan or Alavan may refer to:

- Alvan (company), a Paint Manufacturer
- Alvan (singer), a French singer
- Alvan (biblical figure), a minor biblical figure
- Alvan, East Azerbaijan, a village in East Azerbaijan Province, Iran
- Alvan, Iran, a city in Khuzestan Province
- Alvan, Shadegan, a village in Khuzestan Province
- Alvan-e Eshareh, a village in Khuzestan Province
- Alvan-e Moslem, a village in Khuzestan Province
- Alavan, West Azerbaijan, a village in West Azerbaijan Province, Iran

== See also ==
- Alvin (disambiguation)
