= Ramileh =

Ramileh, Rumaila, Romeyleh, Rameyleh or Remeyleh (Arabic: الرميلة; Persian: رميله) may refer to:

- Rumeilah (Doha), a neighborhood of Doha, Qatar
- Rumeilah, Syria, a village in Aleppo Governorate, Syria
- Rumailah, Saudi Arabia
- Rumailah, UAE
- Rameyleh, Hormozgan, Iran
- Ramileh, Khuzestan, Iran
- Romeyleh-ye Olya, Khuzestan Province, Iran
- Romeyleh-ye Sofla, Khuzestan Province, Iran
- Salah al-Din Square, Cairo, historically known as Rumaila Square
