= Marun =

Marun may refer to:

== People ==
- Marun (name)

== Places ==
- Marun, Iran, village
- Marun River, Khuzestan province, Iran
- Marun Field, oil field in Khuzestan province, Iran
- Marun Seh, village Moshrageh District, Iran
- Marun-e Jayezan, village in Jayezan Rural District, Iran
- Mareham le Fen, Lincolnshire, England, a village listed in the 1086 Domesday Book as Marun

== Other uses ==
- Marun petrochemical complex, petrochemical complex in Mahshahr, Khuzestan, Iran
- Marine Unsaturated Model (MARUN)
- Marun, a type of cowbell used in the Chalandamarz Swiss spring festival

== See also ==
- Maruns, a common name of Stellaria media, a flowering plant
- Maron (disambiguation)
