= Alwan =

Alwan may refer to:

- Alwan (newspaper)
- Alwan (surname)
- Alwan, alternative name for Alodia

== See also ==
- Alvan (disambiguation)
