= Omm ol Heyal =

Omm ol Heyal ام الحيل
- Village
- Location within Iran
- Coordinates: 30°52′56″N 49°37′24″E
- Country: Iran
- Province: Khuzestan
- County: Ramshir
- Bakhsh: Moshrageh
- Rural District: Azadeh

Population (2006)
  - Total: 212
- Time zone: UTC+3:30 (IRST)
  - Summer (DST): UTC+4:30 (IRDT)

Omm ol Heyal (Persian: ام الحيل, also Romanized as Omm ol Ḩeyal; also known as Malḩas-e Omm ol Ḩīl) is a village in Azadeh Rural District, Moshrageh District, Ramshir County, Khuzestan Province, Iran. At the 2006 census, its population was 212, in 36 families.
