= Jaberabad =

Jaberabad جابراباد
- Village
- Location within Iran
- Coordinates: 30°57′00″N 49°31′00″E
- Country: Iran
- Province: Khuzestan
- County: Ramshir
- Bakhsh: Moshrageh
- Rural District: Azadeh

Population (2006)
  - Total: 84
- Time zone: UTC+3:30 (IRST)
  - Summer (DST): UTC+4:30 (IRDT)

Jaberabad (Persian: جابراباد, also Romanized as Jāberābād) is a village in Azadeh Rural District, Moshrageh District, Ramshir County, Khuzestan Province, Iran. At the 2006 census, its population was 84, in 13 families.
