= Beyt-e Savadi =

Beyt-e Savadi بيت سوادي
- Village
- Location within Iran
- Coordinates: 31°11′48″N 49°18′03″E
- Country: Iran
- Province: Khuzestan
- County: Ramshir
- Bakhsh: Moshrageh
- Rural District: Moshrageh

Population (2006)
  - Total: 145
- Time zone: UTC+3:30 (IRST)
  - Summer (DST): UTC+4:30 (IRDT)

Beyt-e Savadi (Persian: بيت سوادي, also romanized as Beyt-e Savādī; also known as Bait as Suwadi, Beyt-e Savādīpūr, and Qaryeh-ye Sa'vādī) is a village in Moshrageh Rural District, Moshrageh District, Ramshir County, Khuzestan Province, Iran. At the 2006 census its population was 145, in 30 families.
