= Omm ol Sakhar =

Omm ol Sakhar or Omm os Sakhar or Omm-os-saxr (Persian: ام الصخر) may refer to:

- Omm ol Sakhar, Ramshir
- Omm ol Sakhar, Shadegan

== See also ==
- Zeyl Omm os Sakhar
