= Abu Sayeed =

Abu Sayeed (also spelled Sayed, Saeed, Sa'eid, Said, Sid, or Sayid) may refer to:

- Abu Sayeed (politician), Bangladeshi politician
- Abu Sa‘id al-Khudri, 7th century Ansari
- Abu Said Gorgani, 9th century Persian mathematician
- Abu Sa'id al-Jannabi, 9th century Bahraini monarch
- Abu Sa'id Al-Janadi (died 920), Islamic scholar
- Abu Sa'id Abu'l-Khayr (967–1049), Persian Sufi poet
- Abu Saeed Mubarak Makhzoomi (1013–1119), Iraqi Sufi saint
- Abu Sa'id Gardezi (died 1061), Persian geographer
- Abu Said al-Baji (1156–1231), Tunisian Sufi Wali
- Abu Sa'id Bahadur Khan (1305–1335), Ilkhanate emperor
- Abu Said Uthman III (died 1420), Moroccan Marinid ruler
- Abu Sa'id Mirza (1424–1469), Timurid monarch
- Abu Sayeed Chowdhury (1921–1987), Bangladeshi jurist
- Abdullah Abu Sayeed (born 1939), Bangladeshi television presenter
- Abu Sayed Mohammad Abdul Awal (born 1957), Bangladesh Navy officer
- Abu Sayeed (film director), Bangladeshi film director
- Abu Sayeed M Ahmed, Bangladeshi architect
- Abu Sayed Bajauri, also known as Abdul Rahman Ghaleb, leader of ISIS–K
- Abu Sayed, Bangladeshi student activist
- Abu Sayeed Chand, Bangladeshi politician (born 1957)

== Places ==
- Abu Said, Iran, a village
