= Husayniyya (disambiguation) =

A husayniyya is a congregation hall for Shia commemoration ceremonies.

Husayniyya may also refer to:

- Husayniyah, Saudi Arabia, a village in Medina Province, Saudi Arabia
- Husseiniya, Jordan, a department and city in Ma'an Governorate, Jordan.
- Husseiniya, al Sharqia, a province and city in al Sharqia Governorate, Egypt.
- Al-Husseiniya District, a town in Baghdad Governorate, Iraq.
- Al-Husayniyya, Safad, a depopulated Palestinian village.

== See also ==
- Hoseyniyeh (disambiguation)
