= Agleh Bachay =

Agleh Bachay عگله بچاي
- Village
- Location within Iran
- Coordinates: 30°55′39″N 49°29′55″E
- Country: Iran
- Province: Khuzestan
- County: Ramshir
- Bakhsh: Moshrageh
- Rural District: Azadeh

Population (2006)
  - Total: 140
- Time zone: UTC+3:30 (IRST)
  - Summer (DST): UTC+4:30 (IRDT)

Agleh Bachay (Persian: عگله بچاي, also Romanized as 'Agleh Bachāy; also known as 'Agal Bechāy, 'Aglah Bachchāy, and 'Agleh Bāchchāy) is a village in Azadeh Rural District, Moshrageh District, Ramshir County, Khuzestan province, Iran. At the 2006 census, its population was 140, in 19 families.
