= Mazibaleh-ye Sofla =

Mazibaleh-ye Sofla مزيبله سفلي
- Village
- Location within Iran
- Coordinates: 30°52′29″N 49°29′45″E
- Country: Iran
- Province: Khuzestan
- County: Ramshir
- Bakhsh: Moshrageh
- Rural District: Azadeh

Population (2006)
  - Total: 112
- Time zone: UTC+3:30 (IRST)
  - Summer (DST): UTC+4:30 (IRDT)

Mazibaleh-ye Sofla (Persian: مزيبله سفلي, also Romanized as Mazībaleh-ye Soflá; also known as Mezeybleh-ye Soflá) is a village in Azadeh Rural District, Moshrageh District, Ramshir County, Khuzestan Province, Iran. At the 2006 census, its population was 112, in 18 families.
