= Shoeyteh =

Shoeyteh شعيطه
- Village
- Location within Iran
- Coordinates: 30°56′56″N 49°29′56″E
- Country: Iran
- Province: Khuzestan
- County: Ramshir
- Bakhsh: Moshrageh
- Rural District: Azadeh

Population (2006)
  - Total: 41
- Time zone: UTC+3:30 (IRST)
  - Summer (DST): UTC+4:30 (IRDT)

Shoeyteh (Persian: شعيطه, also Romanized as Sho‘eyţeh, Sha‘eyţeh, and Sha‘īţeh) is a village in Azadeh Rural District, Moshrageh District, Ramshir County, Khuzestan Province, Iran. At the 2006 census, its population was 41, in 7 families.
