= Moeydeleh =

Moeydeleh or Moedeleh (Persian: معيدله) may refer to:

- Moeydeleh-ye Olya
- Moeydeleh-ye Sofla
