= Abu Shenan-e Sofla =

Abu Shenan-e Sofla ابوشنان سفلي
- Village
- Location within Iran
- Coordinates: 30°54′31″N 49°28′24″E
- Country: Iran
- Province: Khuzestan
- County: Ramshir
- Bakhsh: Moshrageh
- Rural District: Azadeh

Population (2006)
  - Total: 57
- Time zone: UTC+3:30 (IRST)
  - Summer (DST): UTC+4:30 (IRDT)

Abu Shenan-e Sofla (Persian: ابوشنان سفلي, also Romanized as Abū Shenān-e Soflá; also known as Abū Shenān, Abū Shenān-e Pā’īn, and Bū Shenān-e Pā’īn) is a village in Azadeh Rural District, Moshrageh District, Ramshir County, Khuzestan Province, Iran. At the 2006 census, its population was 57, in 10 families.
