= Shakariat =

Shakariat شكريات
- Village
- Location within Iran
- Coordinates: 30°58′12″N 49°28′57″E
- Country: Iran
- Province: Khuzestan
- County: Ramshir
- Bakhsh: Moshrageh
- Rural District: Azadeh

Population (2006)
  - Total: 771
- Time zone: UTC+3:30 (IRST)
  - Summer (DST): UTC+4:30 (IRDT)

Shakariat (Persian: شكريات, also Romanized as Shakarīāt, Shakarīyāt, Shekarīāt, Shekarīyāt, Shikeriyat, and Shokrīāt) is a village in Azadeh Rural District, Moshrageh District, Ramshir County, Khuzestan Province, Iran. At the 2006 census, its population was 771, in 149 families.
