= Beyt-e Khalaf =

Beyt-e Khalaf بيت خلاف
- Village
- Location within Iran
- Coordinates: 31°11′50″N 49°17′54″E
- Country: Iran
- Province: Khuzestan
- County: Ramshir
- Bakhsh: Moshrageh
- Rural District: Moshrageh

Population (2006)
  - Total: 181
- Time zone: UTC+3:30 (IRST)
  - Summer (DST): UTC+4:30 (IRDT)

Beyt-e Khalaf (Persian: بيت خلاف, also Romanized as Beyt-e Khalāf) is a village in Moshrageh Rural District, Moshrageh District, Ramshir County, Khuzestan Province, Iran. At the 2006 census, its population was 181, in 28 families.
