= Diamond (gemstone) =

Gemstone

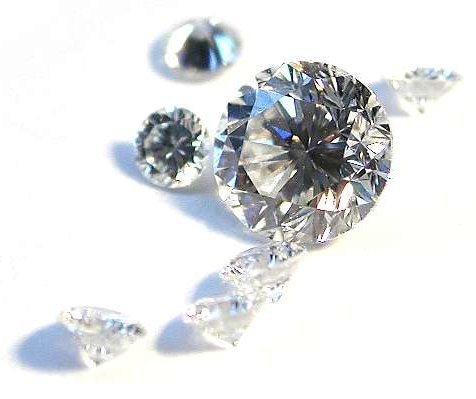
Diamonds in modern brilliant cut.

A diamond (Note: From the Ancient Greek: ἀδάμας adámas, meaning "unbreakable", "proper", or "unalterable") is a gemstone formed by high pressure and heat in the mantle. Diamonds have high monetary value as one of the best-known and most sought-after gems, and they have been used as decorative items since ancient times.

The hardness of a diamond and its high dispersion of light—giving a diamond its characteristic "fire"—make it useful for industrial applications and desirable as jewelry. Diamonds are such a highly traded commodity that multiple organizations have been created for grading and certifying them based on the "four Cs", which are color, cut, clarity, and carat. Other characteristics, such as presence or lack of fluorescence, also affect the desirability and thus the value of a diamond used for jewelry.

Diamonds are often used in engagement rings. The practice is documented among European aristocracy as early as the 15th century, though ruby and sapphire were more desirable gemstones. The modern popularity of diamonds was largely created by De Beers Mining Company, which established the first large-scale diamond mines in South Africa. Through an advertising campaign in the late 1940s and continuing into the mid-20th century, De Beers made diamonds into a key part of the betrothal process and a coveted symbol of status. The diamond's high value has also been the driving force behind dictators and revolutionary entities, especially in Africa, using slave and child labor to mine blood diamonds to fund conflicts. Though popularly believed to derive its value from its rarity, gem-quality diamonds are quite common compared to rare gemstones such as alexandrite, and annual global rough diamond production is estimated to be about 130 million carats (26 tonnes; 29 short tons).

== History ==
=== Early ===
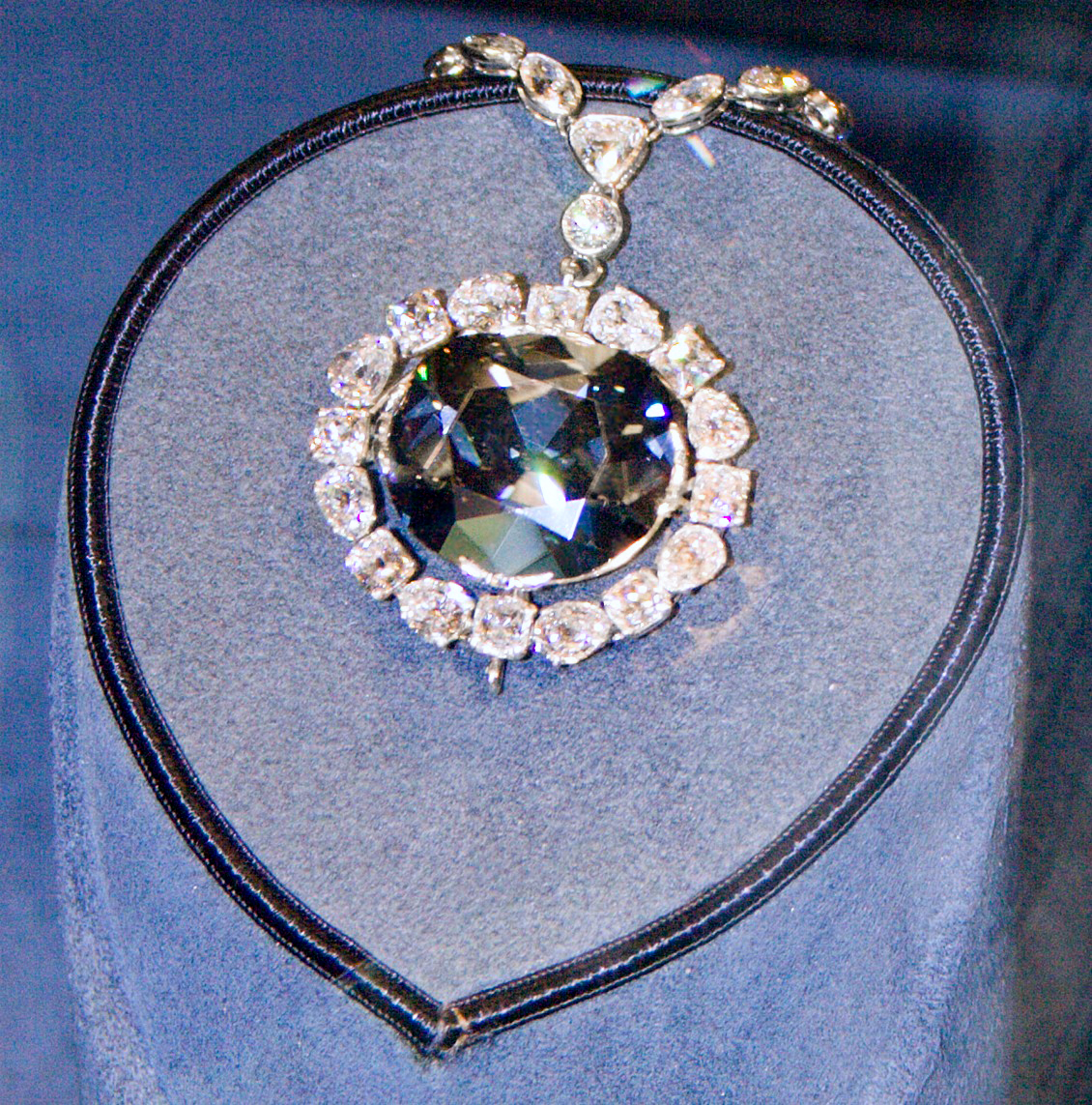
The Hope Diamond. Its deep blue coloration is caused by trace amounts of boron in the diamond.

The process of diamonds being used for drilling ornamental beads dates back to 2nd millennium BC. Archaeologists working in Yemen have excavated beads with evidences of diamond drilling from 1200 BC to the 1st century AD from the site of Hajar ar Rayhani, with double diamond drilling from 1000 to 600 BC. The double diamond drill technique was present in Western India prior to 600 BC (7th century BC). There is also evidence of technique of double diamond drilling from Southern Thailand dating back to 400 BC.

Before diamonds were discovered in Brazil in the 1700s, India was the only place where diamonds were mined. Early references to diamonds in India come from Sanskrit texts. The Arthashastra of Kautilya mentions diamond trade in India. Buddhist works dating from the 4th century BC describe the diamond as a well-known and precious stone but do not mention the details of diamond cutting. Another Indian description written in the beginning of the 3rd century describes strength, regularity, brilliance, ability to scratch metals, and good refractive properties as the desirable qualities of a diamond. Calcutta was an important trading center for diamonds in central India.

Diamonds were traded to the east and west of India and were recognized by various cultures for their gemological or industrial uses. In his work Naturalis Historia, the Roman writer Pliny the Elder referred to the adamas (invulnerable stone) that occurred alongside gold and was used for ornament and engraving. This was long believed to refer to diamond, but is now thought more likely to mean other hard minerals such as corundum or spinel. (Note: Pliny in Book XXXVII, (15).61, mentioned Germany as the best location of adamas. E. Caley and J. Richards also discuss Pliny's reference in Book XXXVI, (10).54, of the stone of Naxos as being adamas, and which had long been used for cutting and polishing. A chief product of Naxos has long been a high grade of amorphous corundum which was used as an abrasive. ("Theophrastus, On Stones", E Caley, J. Richards, Ohio State University, 1956, page 91). They further discuss his referral to the adamas coming from the "east" through Armenian traders, but they show this was actually based on an erroneous interpretation of Theophrastus. Williams (Gardner F. Williams, Diamond Mines of South Africa, New York, BF Buck Company, 1905) argues that the stone named adamas by the Greek and further referred to by Pliny was most likely a sapphire, since this was a much more abundant stone, even among traders in Asia, than diamond (especially when used in the context of adamas being an ornamental stone and not used in an "industrial" context of engraving gems). Streeter argues similarly in his book (Edwin Streeter, Precious Stones and gems, London, Bell and Sons, 1898). There seems to be a consensus over a large period of time that in fact the "adamas" was not a diamond, but mostly any type of corundum, several other minerals such as spinel were probably confused with diamonds as well; particularly because of a similarity in hardness and their availability in the Mediterranean area. (see discussion in Theophrastus).)

Diamonds eventually spread throughout the world, even though India had remained the only major source of the gemstone until diamonds were discovered in Brazil in 1725. The establishment of maritime trade between Europe and India following Vasco da Gama's voyage in 1498 provided Europeans with more consistent access to diamonds. A Chinese work from the 3rd century BC mentions: "Foreigners wear it [diamond] in the belief that it can ward off evil influences". The Chinese, who did not find diamonds in their country, initially did not use diamond as a jewel but used it as a "jade cutting knife". Diamonds reached ancient Rome from India. Diamonds were also discovered in 700 in Borneo, and were used by the traders of southeast Asia.

=== Modern ===
The modern era of diamond mining began in the 1860s in Kimberley, South Africa with the opening of the first large-scale diamond mine. The first diamond there was found in 1866 on the banks of the Orange River and became known as the Eureka Diamond.

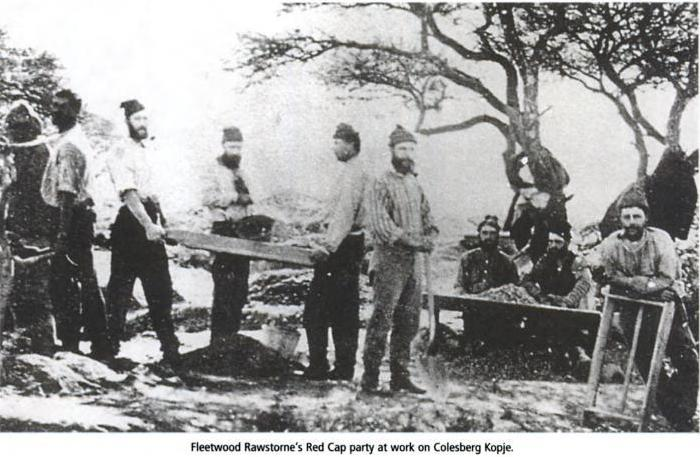
Fleetwood Rawstone's "Red Cap Party" of prospectors on Colesberg Kopje

In 1869, an even larger 83.50-carat (16.700 g; 0.5891 oz) diamond was found on the slopes of Colesberg Kopje on the farm Vooruitzigt belonging to the De Beers brothers. This sparked off the famous "New Rush" and within a month, 800 claims were cut into the hillock which were worked frenetically by two to three thousand men. As the land was lowered, the hillock became a mine—in time, the world-renowned Kimberley Mine. Following agreement by the British government on compensation to the Orange Free State for its competing land claims, Griqualand West was annexed to the Cape Colony in 1877.

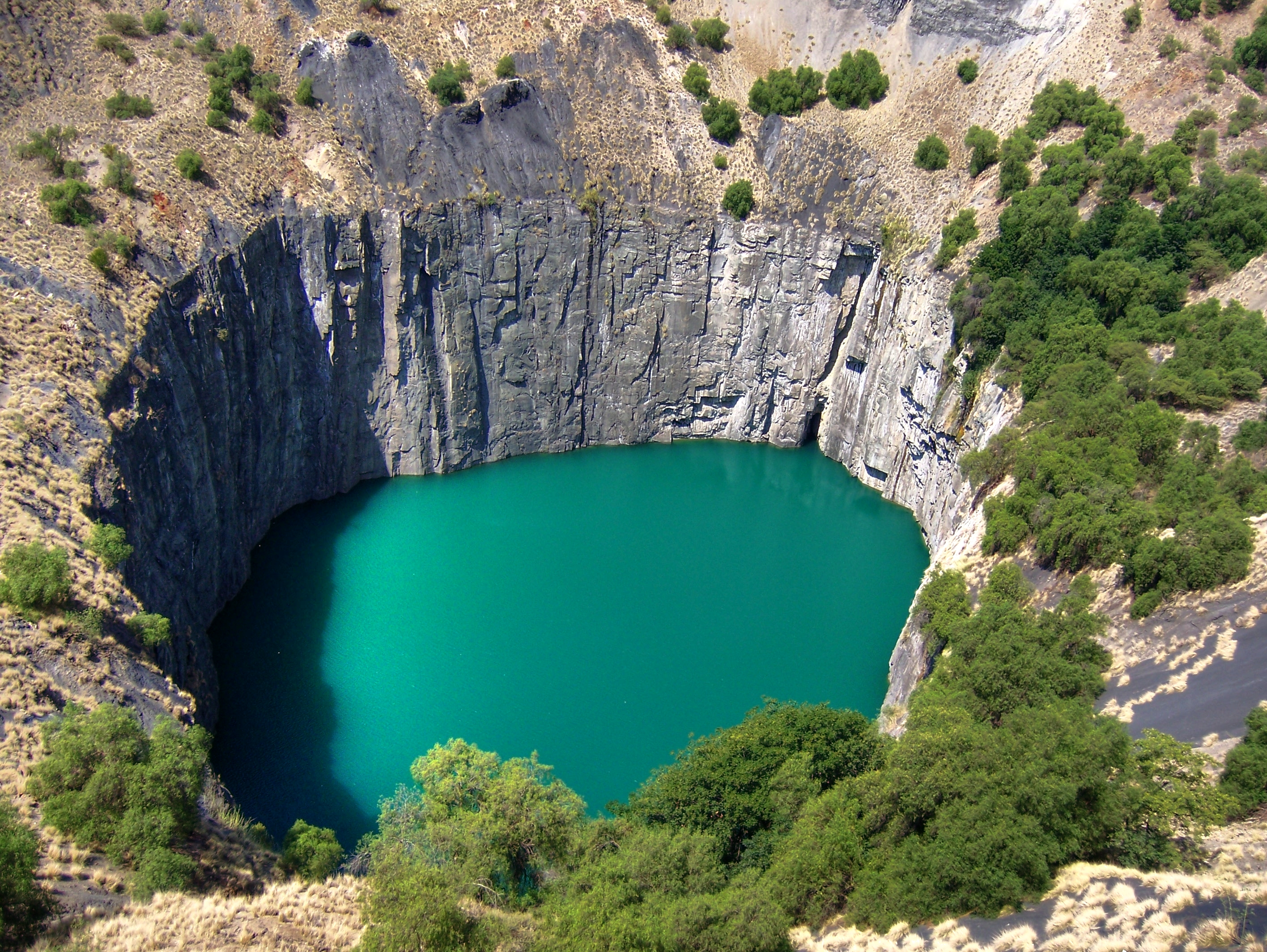
The Big Hole.

From 1871 to 1914, 50,000 miners dug the Big Hole with picks and shovels, yielding 2,722 kg (6,001 lb) of diamonds, and by 1873 Kimberley was the second largest town in South Africa, having an approximate population of 40,000.

The various smaller mining companies were amalgamated by the British businessmen Cecil Rhodes and Charles Rudd into the De Beers Mining Company, and the Barnato Diamond Mining Company by Barney Barnato. In 1888, the two companies merged to form De Beers Consolidated Mines, which proceeded to establish a monopoly over the world's diamond market. That monopoly had ended by 2005, following an antitrust lawsuit in the US (which De Beers settled without admitting wrongdoing, upon payment of a US$295 million settlement), and a voluntary agreement between De Beers and the European Commission. The latter agreement had been overturned upon appeal by the Russian mining company Alrosa, but the European Court of Justice then upheld the decision and the European Commission subsequently concluded its investigation with no more action being taken against De Beers.

Annual global rough diamond production was estimated to be about 135 million carats (27.0 tonnes; 30 short tons) for 2014, of which 92% was cut and polished in India, mostly in the city of Surat. Some 85% of the world's rough diamonds, 50% of cut diamonds, and 40% of industrial diamonds are traded in Antwerp, Belgium—the diamond center of the world. The city of Antwerp also hosts the Antwerpsche Diamantkring, created in 1929 to become the first and biggest diamond bourse dedicated to rough diamonds. Antwerp's association with diamonds began in the late 15th century when a new technique to polish and shape the gems evolved in this city. The diamond cutters of Antwerp are world renowned for their skill. More than 12,000 expert cutters and polishers are at work in the Diamond District, at 380 workshops, serving 1,500 firms and 3,500 brokers and merchants.

In the 21st century, the technology to produce perfect diamonds synthetically was developed. Diamonds produced by the latest technologies are visually identical to mined, naturally occurring diamonds. The price of lab-grown vs. natural diamonds has fallen considerably, from a 20% discount in 2017 to a 80% discount in 2023. By 2024, lab-grown diamonds represented 25% of the value of the global diamond market and 50% of the U.S. engagement ring market by volume. The growth in popularity of synthetic diamonds, combined with demand issues caused by geopolitical and economic instability, and changing consumption habits among younger consumers, has caused a dramatic drop in the price of mined diamonds and an industry crisis, with mines and polishing facilitates closing or suspending production.

== Characteristics ==
The most familiar usage of diamonds today is as gemstones used for adornment—a usage which dates back into antiquity. The dispersion of white light into spectral colors is the primary gemological characteristic of gem diamonds. In the twentieth century, gemologists have developed methods of grading diamonds and other gemstones based on the characteristics most important to their value as a gem. Four characteristics known informally as the "four Cs" are now commonly used as the basic descriptors of diamonds: carat, cut, color, and clarity. This system was developed by Gemological Institute of America in 1953 as internationally recognized standard to evaluate diamonds' characteristics.

Most gem diamonds are traded on the wholesale market based on single values for each of the four Cs; for example knowing that a diamond is rated as 1.5 carats (300 mg), VS2 clarity, F color, excellent cut round brilliant, is enough to reasonably establish an expected price range. More detailed information from within each characteristic is used to determine actual market value for individual stones. Consumers who purchase individual diamonds are often advised to use the four Cs to pick the diamond that is "right" for them.

Other characteristics also influence the value and appearance of a gem diamond. These include physical characteristics such as the presence of fluorescence as well as the diamond's source and which gemological institute evaluated the diamond. Cleanliness also dramatically affects a diamond's beauty.

There are two major non-profit gemological associations which grade and provide reports, (informally referred to by the term certificate or cert, which is a misnomer for many grading reports) on diamonds; while carat weight and cut angles are mathematically defined, the clarity and color are judged by the trained human eye and are therefore open to slight variance in interpretation. These associations are listed below.

- Gemological Institute of America (GIA) was the first laboratory in America to issue modern diamond reports, and is held in high regard amongst gemologists for its consistent, conservative grading.
- Diamond High Council (HRD) Official certification laboratory of the Belgian diamond industry, located in Antwerp.

Within the last two decades, a number of for-profit gemological grading laboratories have also been established, many of them also based in Antwerp or New York. These entities serve to provide similar services as the non-profit associations above, but in a less expensive and more timely fashion. They produce certificates that are similar to those of the GIA.

=== Weight ===
The carat weight measures the mass of a diamond. One carat is defined as 200 milligrams (about 0.007 ounces avoirdupois). The point unit—equal to one one-hundredth of a carat (0.01 carat, or 2 mg)—is commonly used for diamonds of less than one carat. All else being equal, the price per carat increases with carat weight, since larger diamonds are both rarer and more desirable for use as gemstones.

The price per carat does not increase linearly (proportionally) with increasing size. Instead, there are sharp jumps around milestone carat weights, as demand is much higher for diamonds weighing just more than a milestone than for those weighing just less. As an example, a 0.99-carat diamond may have a significantly lower price per carat than a comparable 1.01-carat diamond, because of differences in demand.

A weekly diamond price list, the Rapaport Diamond Report is published by Martin Rapaport, CEO of Rapaport Group of New York, for different diamond cuts, clarity and weights. It is considered the de facto retail price baseline. Jewelers often trade diamonds at negotiated discounts off the Rapaport price (e.g., "R −3%").

In the wholesale trade of gem diamonds, carat is often used in denominating lots of diamonds for sale. For example, a buyer may place an order for 100 carats (20 g) of 0.5-carat (100 mg), D–F, VS2-SI1, excellent cut diamonds, indicating a wish to purchase 200 diamonds (100 carats (20 g) total mass) of those approximate characteristics. Because of this, diamond prices (particularly among wholesalers and other industry professionals) are often quoted per carat, rather than per stone.

Total carat weight (t.c.w.) is a phrase used to describe the total mass of diamonds or other gemstone in a piece of jewelry, when more than one gemstone is used. Diamond solitaire earrings, for example, are usually quoted in t.c.w. when placed for sale, indicating the mass of the diamonds in both earrings and not each individual diamond. T.c.w. is also widely used for diamond necklaces, bracelets and other similar jewelry pieces.

=== Clarity ===
Clarity is a measure of internal defects of a diamond called inclusions. Inclusions may be crystals of a foreign material or another diamond crystal, or structural imperfections such as tiny cracks that can appear whitish or cloudy. The number, size, color, relative location, orientation, and visibility of inclusions can all affect the relative clarity of a diamond. The Gemological Institute of America (GIA) and other organizations have developed systems to grade clarity, which are based on those inclusions which are visible to a trained professional when a diamond is viewed under 10× magnification.

Diamonds become increasingly rare when considering higher clarity gradings. Only about 20% of all diamonds mined have a clarity rating high enough for the diamond to be considered appropriate for use as a gemstone; the other 80% are relegated to industrial use. Of that top 20%, a significant portion contains one or more visible inclusions. Those that do not have a visible inclusion are known as "eye-clean" and are preferred by most buyers, although visible inclusions can sometimes be hidden under the setting in a piece of jewelry.

Most inclusions present in gem-quality diamonds do not affect the diamonds' performance or structural integrity. When set in jewelry, it may also be possible to hide certain inclusion behind mounting hardware such as prongs in a way that renders the defect invisible. However, large clouds can affect a diamond's ability to transmit and scatter light. Large cracks close to or breaking the surface may increase the likelihood of a fracture.

Diamonds are graded by the major societies on a scale ranging from flawless to imperfect.

=== Color ===
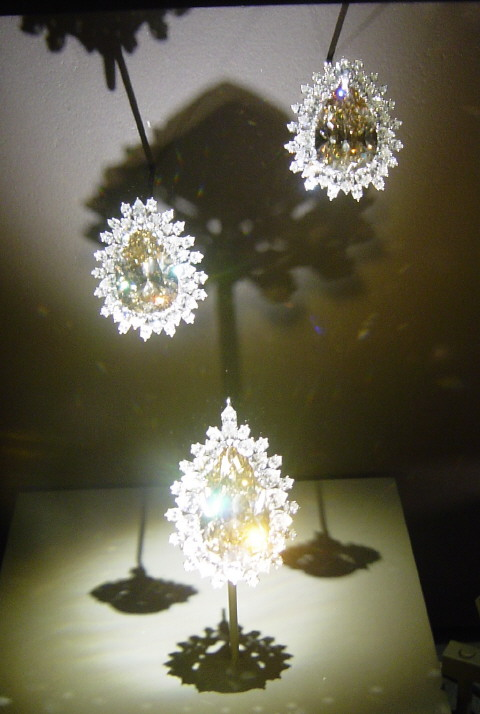
Jewelers sometimes set diamonds in groups of similar colors.

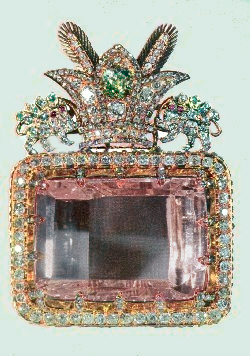
The Darya-I-Nur Diamond

The finest quality as per color grading is totally colorless, which is graded as D color diamond across the globe, meaning it is absolutely free from any color. The next grade has a very slight trace of color, which can be observed by any expert diamond valuer/grading laboratory. However, when studded in jewellery these very light colored diamonds do not show any color or it is not possible to make out color shades. These are graded as E color or F color diamonds.

Diamonds which show very little traces of color are graded as G or H color diamonds. Slightly colored diamonds are graded as I or J or K color. A diamond can be found in any color in addition to colorless. Some of the colored diamonds, such as pink, are very rare.

A chemically pure and structurally perfect diamond is perfectly transparent with no hue, or color. However, in reality most gem-sized natural diamonds are imperfect. The color of a diamond may be affected by chemical impurities and/or structural defects in the crystal lattice. Depending on the hue and intensity of a diamond's coloration, a diamond's color can either detract from or enhance its value. For example, most white diamonds are discounted in price as a more yellow hue is detectable, while intense pink or blue diamonds (such as the Hope Diamond) can be dramatically more valuable. The Aurora Diamond Collection displays a spectacular array of naturally colored diamonds, which occur in every color of the rainbow.

Most diamonds used as gemstones are basically transparent with little tint, or white diamonds. The most common impurity, nitrogen, replaces a small proportion of carbon atoms in a diamond's structure and causes a yellowish to brownish tint. This effect is present in almost all white diamonds; in only the rarest diamonds is the coloration from this effect undetectable. The GIA has developed a rating system for color in white diamonds, from D to Z (with D being "colorless" and Z having a bright yellow coloration), which has been widely adopted in the industry and is universally recognized, superseding several older systems. The GIA system uses a benchmark set of natural diamonds of known color grade, along with standardized and carefully controlled lighting conditions. Diamonds with higher color grades are rarer, in higher demand, and therefore more expensive, than lower color grades. Oddly enough, diamonds graded Z are also rare, and the bright yellow color is also highly valued. Diamonds graded D–F are considered "colorless", G–J are considered "near-colorless", K–M are "slightly colored". N–Y usually appears light yellow or brown.

In contrast to yellow or brown hues, diamonds of other colors are more rare and valuable. While even a pale pink or blue hue may increase the value of a diamond, more intense coloration is usually considered more desirable and commands the highest prices. A variety of impurities and structural imperfections cause different colors in diamonds, including yellow, pink, blue, red, green, brown, and other hues. There is also a kind of pebble containing polycrystalline diamond that is black or gray, called carbonado, which may be of extraterrestrial origin. It is the toughest form of diamond and is used as an abrasive, though sometimes also as precious stone (for example The Enigma & The Black Falcon). Diamonds with unusual or intense coloration are sometimes labeled "fancy" in the diamond industry. Intense yellow coloration is considered one of the fancy colors, and is separate from the color grades of white diamonds. Gemologists have developed rating systems for fancy colored diamonds, but they are not in common use because of the relative rarity of such diamonds.

=== Cut ===
Diamond cutting is the art and science of creating a gem-quality diamond out of mined rough. The cut of a diamond describes the manner in which a diamond has been shaped and polished from its beginning form as a rough stone to its final gem proportions. The cut of a diamond describes the quality of workmanship and the angles to which a diamond is cut. Often diamond cut is confused with "shape".

There are mathematical guidelines for the angles and length ratios at which the diamond is supposed to be cut in order to reflect the maximum amount of light. Round brilliant diamonds, the most common, are guided by these specific guidelines, though fancy cut stones are not able to be as accurately guided by mathematical specifics.

The techniques for cutting diamonds have been developed over hundreds of years, with perhaps the greatest achievements made in 1919 by mathematician and gem enthusiast Marcel Tolkowsky. He developed the round brilliant cut by calculating the ideal shape to return and scatter light when a diamond is viewed from above. The modern round brilliant has 57 facets (polished faces), counting 33 on the crown (the top half), and 24 on the pavilion (the lower half). The girdle is the thin middle part. The function of the crown is to refract light into various colors, and the pavilion's function is to reflect light back through the top of the diamond.

Tolkowsky's calculations included some approximations. He calculated the ideal dimensions as:

- Table percentage (corner-to-corner diameter of the table divided by overall diameter) = 53%
- Depth percentage (overall depth divided by overall diameter) = 59.3% (not including adjustments for the culet height and girdle thickness)
- Pavilion angle (angle between the girdle and the pavilion main facets) = 40.75°
- Crown angle (angle between the girdle and the crown's kite facets) = 34.5°
- Pavilion depth (depth of pavilion divided by overall diameter) = 43.1%
- Crown depth (depth of crown divided by overall diameter) = 16.2%

The culet is the tiny point or facet at the bottom of the diamond. This should be a negligible diameter, otherwise light leaks out of the bottom. Tolkowsky's calculations included neither a culet nor a girdle. However, a girdle is required in reality in order to prevent the diamond from easily chipping in the setting. The thick part of the girdle is normally about 1.7% (of the overall diameter) thicker than the thin part of the girdle.

The further the diamond's characteristics are from the Tolkowsky's ideal, the less light will be reflected. However, there is a small range in which the diamond can be considered "ideal". Tolkowsky's calculations can be repeated for a narrow range of pavilion angles. Such calculations show a slightly larger table percentage, and a trade-off between pavilion angle and crown angle.

Today, because of the relative importance of carat weight among buyers, many diamonds are often intentionally cut poorly to increase carat weight. There is a financial premium for a diamond that weighs the desirable 1.0 carat (200 mg), so often the girdle is made thicker or the depth is increased. Neither of these changes makes the diamond appear any larger, and both greatly reduce the sparkle of the diamond. (A poorly cut 1.0-carat (200 mg) diamond may have the same diameter and appear as large as a 0.85-carat (170 mg) diamond.) The depth percentage is the overall quickest indication of the quality of the cut of a round brilliant. "Ideal" round brilliant diamonds should not have a depth percentage greater than 62.5%. Another quick indication is the overall diameter. Typically a round brilliant 1.0-carat (200 mg) diamond should have a diameter of about 6.5 mm (0.26 in). Mathematically, the diameter in millimeters of a round brilliant should approximately equal to 6.5 times the cube root of carat weight, or 11.1 times the cube root of gram weight, or 1.4 times the cube root of point weight.

==== Shape ====
Diamonds do not show all of their beauty as rough stones; instead, they must be cut and polished to exhibit the characteristic fire and brilliance that diamond gemstones are known for. Diamonds are cut into a variety of shapes that are generally designed to accentuate these features.

Diamonds which are not cut into a round brilliant shape are known as "fancy cuts." Popular fancy cuts include the baguette (French, meaning rod or loaf of bread), marquise, princess cut (square outline), heart, briolette (a form of the rose cut), and pear cuts. Newer cuts that have been introduced into the jewelry industry are the "cushion" "radiant" (similar to princess cuts, but with rounded edges instead of square edges) and Asscher cuts. Many fancy colored diamonds are now being cut according to these new styles. Generally speaking, these "fancy cuts" are not held to the same strict standards as Tolkowsky-derived round brilliants and there are less specific mathematical guidelines of angles which determine a well-cut stone. Cuts are influenced heavily by fashion: the baguette cut—which accentuates a diamond's luster and downplays its fire—was popular during the Art Deco period, whereas the princess cut — which accentuates a diamond's fire rather than its luster — is currently gaining popularity. The princess cut is also popular amongst diamond cutters: of all the cuts, it wastes the least of the original crystal. The past decades have seen the development of new diamond cuts, often based on a modification of an existing cut. Some of these include extra facets. These newly developed cuts are viewed by many as more of an attempt at brand differentiation by diamond sellers, than actual improvements to the state of the art.

==== Quality ====
The quality of a diamond's cut is widely considered the most important of the four Cs in determining the beauty of a diamond; indeed, it is commonly acknowledged that a well-cut diamond can appear to be of greater carat weight, and have clarity and color appear to be of better grade than they actually are. The skill with which a diamond is cut determines its ability to reflect and refract light.

In addition to carrying the most importance to a diamond's quality as a gemstone, the cut is also the most difficult to quantitatively judge. A number of factors, including proportion, polish, symmetry, and the relative angles of various facets, are determined by the quality of the cut and can affect the performance of a diamond. A diamond with facets cut only a few degrees out of alignment can result in a poorly performing stone. For a round brilliant cut, there is a balance between "brilliance" and "fire". When a diamond is cut for too much "fire", it looks like a cubic zirconia, which gives off much more "fire" than real diamond. A well-executed round brilliant cut should reflect light upwards and make the diamond appear white when viewed from the top. An inferior cut will produce a stone that appears dark at the center and in extreme cases the setting may be seen through the top of the diamond as shadows.

Several different theories on the "ideal" proportions of a diamond have been and continue to be advocated by various owners of patents on machines to view how well a diamond is cut. These advocate a shift away from grading cut by the use of various angles and proportions toward measuring the performance of a cut stone. A number of specially modified viewers and machines have been developed toward this end. Hearts and Arrows viewers test for the "hearts and arrows" characteristic pattern observable in stones exhibiting high symmetry and particular cut angles. Closely related to Hearts and Arrows viewers is the ASET which tests for light leakage, light return, and proportions. The ASET (and computer simulations of the ASET) are used to test for AGS cut grade. Proponents of these machines argue they help sellers demonstrate the light performance of the diamond in addition to the traditional 4 Cs. Detractors, however, see these machines as marketing tools rather than scientific ones. The GIA has developed a set of criteria for grading the cut of round brilliant stones that is now the standard in the diamond industry and is called Facetware.

==== Process ====
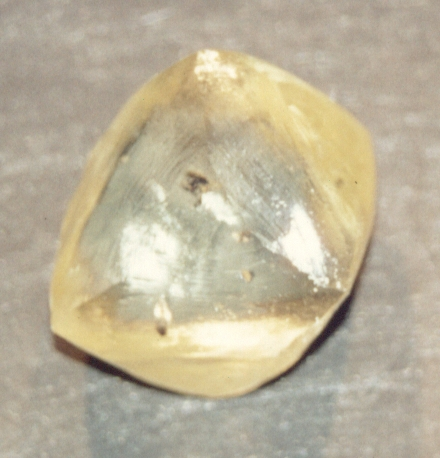
The 253-carat (50.6 g) Oppenheimer Diamond, at a 2001 diamond exhibition in Paris. An uncut diamond does not show its prized optical properties.

The process of shaping a rough diamond into a polished gemstone is both an art and a science. The choice of cut is often decided by the original shape of the rough stone, location of the inclusions and flaws to be eliminated, the preservation of the weight, popularity of certain shapes amongst consumers and many other considerations. The round brilliant cut is preferred when the crystal is an octahedron, as often two stones may be cut from one such crystal. Oddly shaped crystals such as macles are more likely to be cut in a fancy cut—that is, a cut other than the round brilliant—which the particular crystal shape lends itself to.

Even with modern techniques, the cutting and polishing of a diamond crystal always results in a dramatic loss of weight; rarely is it less than 50%. Sometimes the cutters compromise and accept lesser proportions and symmetry in order to avoid inclusions or to preserve the carat rating. Since the per carat price of diamond shifts around key milestones (such as 1.00 carat (200 mg)), many one-carat diamonds are the result of compromising cut for carat. Some jewelry experts advise consumers to buy a 0.99-carat (198 mg) diamond for its better price or buy a 1.10-carat (220 mg) diamond for its better cut, avoiding a 1.00-carat (200 mg) diamond which is more likely to be a poorly cut stone.

==== Light performance ====
In the gem trade, the term light performance is used to describe how well a polished diamond will return light to the viewer. There are three light properties which are described in relation to light performance: brilliance, fire, and scintillation. Brilliance refers to the white light reflections from the external and internal facet surfaces. Fire refers to the spectral colors which are produced as a result of the diamond dispersing the white light. Scintillation refers to the small flashes of light that are seen when the diamond, light source or the viewer is moved. A diamond that is cut and polished to produce a high level of these qualities is said to be high in light performance.

The setting diamonds are placed in also affect the performance of light through a diamond. The three most commonly used settings are: Prong, Bezel, and Channel. Prong settings are the most popular setting for diamond jewelry. The prong setting consists of four or six 'claws' that cradle the diamond, allowing the maximum amount of light to enter from all angles, allowing the diamonds to appear larger and more brilliant. In bezel settings the diamond or gemstone is completely surrounded by a rim of metal, which can be molded into any shape to accommodate the stone. Used to set earrings, necklaces, bracelets, and rings, bezel settings can have open or closed backs, and generally can be molded to allow a lot of light to pass through. Channel settings set the stones right next to each other with no metal separating them. This setting is mostly used in wedding and anniversary bands. The outer ridge is then worked over the edges of the stones to create a smooth exterior surface. This also protects the girdle area of the stone.

=== Fluorescence ===
About a third of all diamonds will glow under ultraviolet light, usually a blue color, which may be noticeable under a black light or strong sunlight. According to the GIA, who reviewed a random sample of 26,010 natural diamonds, 65% of the diamonds in the sample did not fluoresce. Of the 35% that did fluoresce, 97% had blue fluorescence of which 38% had faint blue fluorescence and 62% had fluorescence that ranged from medium to very strong blue. Other colors diamonds can fluoresce are green, yellow, and red, but are very rare and are sometimes a combination of the colors such as blue-green or orange. In October 2020, a population of diamonds were discovered within an alluvial deposit at the Ellendale diamond field in Australia that exhibit an ultra rare purple fluorescence.

Some diamonds with "very strong" fluorescence can have a "milky" or "oily" look to them, but they are also very rare and are termed "over-blues." Their study concluded that with the exception of "over-blues" and yellow fluorescent diamonds, fluorescence had little effect on transparency and that the strong and very strong blue fluorescent diamonds on average had better color appearance than non-fluorescent stones. Since blue is a complementary color to yellow and so can appear to cancel it out, strong blue fluorescence had especially better color appearance with lower color graded diamonds that have a slight yellowish tint, such as I or J color, but had little effect on the more colorless D, E, and F color grades.

==== Trade History ====
Before the diamond industry standardized to the GIA grading terminology the term "Blue White" (Blauweiss) was widely used to describe the most highly regarded white diamonds. The term described colorless diamonds with a tinge of blue fluorescence. These stones were actively sought by merchants thanks to their appealing ‘ice’ effect and consumers paid higher prices for diamonds with fluorescence. Quality retailers such as C. D. Peacock of Chicago Il. made their name selling genuine Blue-White diamonds, but others in the industry saw the opportunity to use the term to sell lower quality diamonds.

By 1938, the term "Blue White" and the underlying concept that blue (i.e. fluorescence) added value to white (colorless) diamonds had become abused by too many unscrupulous dealers and the U.S. Federal Trade Commission outlawed the use of the term Blue White. The subsequent FTC restrictions undoubtedly encouraged the establishment of today's GIA color grading system. The new GIA grading system had no place for the effect of fluorescence on color and the desirability of fluorescence in a diamond began to wane in the years that followed. Diamonds with fluorescence were marked down in price.

Ironically, in 1997, a seminal study by the Gemological Institute of America (GIA) concluded that, "in general, the strength of fluorescence had no widely perceptible effect on the color appearance of diamonds viewed table-down (as is typical in laboratory and trade grading). In the table-up position (as is commonly encountered in jewellery stores), diamonds described as strongly or very strongly fluorescent were, on average, reported as having a better color appearance than less fluorescent stones". The GIA study concluded that "the diamond industry would be better served by considering each individual diamond on its own visual merits."

=== Cleaning ===
Cleanliness significantly affects a diamond's beauty. A clean diamond is more brilliant and fiery than the same diamond when it is "dirty". Dirt or grease on the top of a diamond reduces its luster. Water, dirt, or grease on the bottom of a diamond interferes with the diamond's brilliance and fire. Even a thin film absorbs some light that could have been reflected to the viewer. Colored dye or smudges can affect the perceived color of a diamond. Historically, some jewelers' stones were misgraded because of smudges on the girdle, or dye on the culet. Current practice is to clean a diamond thoroughly before grading its color.

Maintaining a clean diamond can sometimes be difficult as jewelry settings can obstruct cleaning, and oils, grease, and other hydrophobic materials adhere well to a diamond. Furthermore, the intricate facets of certain diamond cuts may trap dirt and grime, requiring specialized cleaning techniques. Many jewelers use steam cleaners. Some jewelers provide their customers with ammonia-based cleaning kits; ultrasonic cleaners are also popular.

== Value ==
The value of a diamond gemstone depends upon colour and quality, as well as weight. As of April 2024 the average price per carat of diamonds of between 1.00 and 1.49 carats was US$4,448. The price of diamonds dropped significantly from a peak in 2022; prices of natural gems in shops dropped by 26% by the beginning of 2025. Laboratory-grown diamonds had dropped by 74% since 2020. Prices were expected to continue decreasing. De Beers had started 2024 with $2bn worth of diamonds, which it had not sold by the end of the year. The company cut production by 20%, and its owner, Anglo American, was seeking to sell it. Causes for the continuing decline were suggested as lower demand in China, the general global economy, and fewer marriages, but improvement in speed of laboratory growing of diamonds from weeks (and billions of years for natural stones) to hours was thought to be the biggest change. Historian of jewellery Jack Ogden said "It's a very artificial market. They're very valuable because people want to pay money for them. People want to pay money for them because they're very valuable", but that this self-sustaining loop might not always continue to sustain itself.

== Symbolism and lores ==
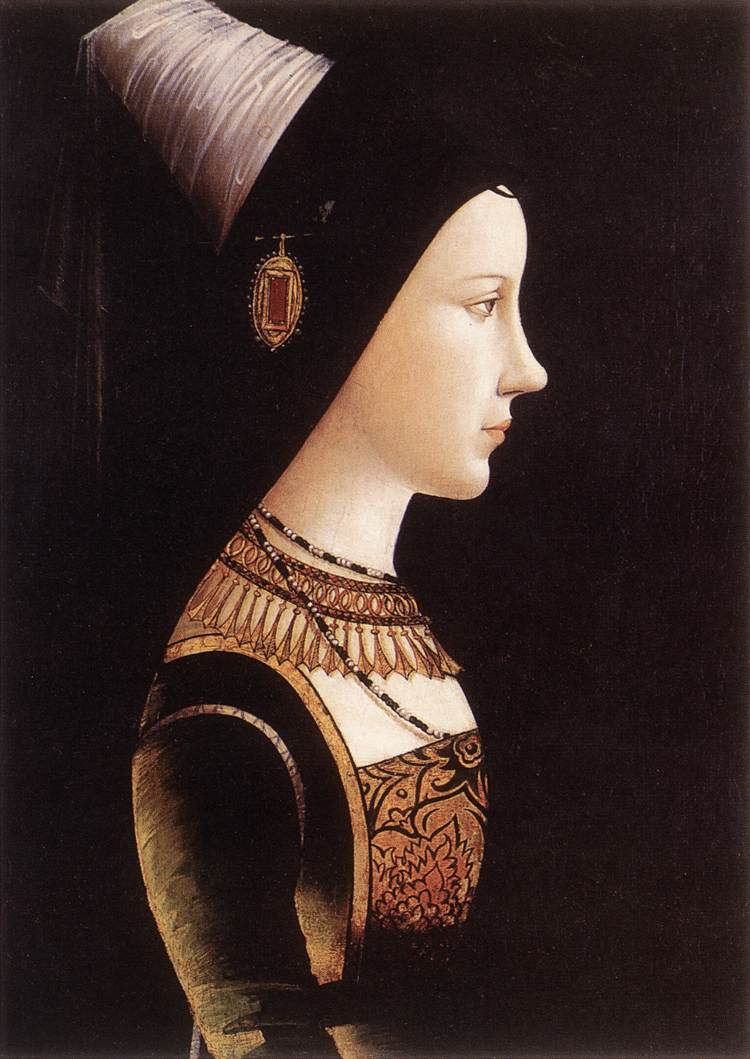
Mary of Burgundy is the first known recipient of a diamond engagement ring, in 1477.

Historically, it has been claimed that diamonds possess several supernatural powers:

- A diamond gives victory to they who carry it bound on their left arm, no matter the number of enemies.
- Panics, pestilences, enchantments, all fly before it; hence, it is good for sleepwalkers and the insane.
- It deprives lodestones and magnets of their virtue (i.e., ability to attract iron).
- Arabic diamonds are said to attract iron more than a magnet.
- A diamond's hardiness can only be broken by smearing it with fresh goat's blood.
- In traditional Hinduism one should avoid contact with a diamond whose surface area is damaged by a crack, a crowfoot, a round, dull, speckled area, or which is black-blue, flat, or is cut other than the (ideal) hexagonal shape.

Because of their extraordinary physical properties, diamonds have been used symbolically since near the time of their first discovery. Perhaps the earliest symbolic use of diamonds was as the eyes of Hindu devotional statues. (Note: Catelle, W.R. (1911). The Diamond. John Lane Company. p. 14. He describes diamonds being worn as long as 5000 years ago, recorded in ancient Hindu writings. George Frederick Kunz in 'A Curious Lore of Precious Stones' describes how a diamond in ancient times is worn on the forehead until the early 19th century this was a tradition believed to bring good luck. Devotional statues is not specifically mentioned) In Hinduism Indra uses Vajrayudham or the thunderbolt as his primary weapon. Vajra is the word for diamond and ayudham means weapon in Sanskrit. Another name for it was Agira which means fire or the sun. Fourteen names are used for a diamond in traditional Hinduism.

The oldest dated printed book in the world is called the Diamond Sutra, a Chinese text dating from 868 found in the Mogao Caves. Sutras are most used to describe the teachings of Buddha. In this case the title of the Sutra refers not to the diamond itself but to a 'diamond blade that will cut through worldly illusion to illuminate what is real and everlasting'. Jewel imagery forms a central part of Buddhism: the triple-jewel represents 'Buddha', his teachings 'Dharma' and the spiritual community 'Shangha'. The book is in the British Library.

Many cultures attribute the origin and creation of gemstones, including diamonds, to divine intervention. In Greek mythology, for example, the youth on the island of Crete disturbed Zeus and were then, as punishment, transformed into the adamas.

Philosophers however had a more naturalistic approach to explain the origin of gems: Plato for example believed gemstones were a consequence of fermentation in the stars, where a diamond actually formed the kernel of gold-bearing mass. Diamonds were often linked with gold, possibly due to the joint occurrence of diamonds with quartzite, quartz veins and an occasional occurrence of gold in them.

In later times, Robert Boyle believed that gems, including diamonds, were formed of clear, transparent water, and that their colors and characteristics were derived from their metallic spirit.

The diamond is the birthstone for people born in April, and symbolises a sixty-year anniversary, such as a Diamond Jubilee or diamond wedding (see hierarchy of precious substances). In a system of heraldry by gemstone occasionally used in the past for the arms of nobles, diamond was used to represent the color sable, or black.

== Rings ==
1.13-carat (226 mg) round diamond engagement ring.

The origin of the custom to use diamonds in rings, and more recently, in engagement rings, can be traced back to the Middle Ages and even the Romans. The Romans valued the diamond entirely on account of the supernatural powers they ascribed to it. Pliny wrote that a diamond baffles poison, keeps off insanity, and dispels vain fears. The medieval Italians copied these beliefs and added some to it: they called it the "Pietra della Reconciliazione" (stone of reconciliation) because it maintained concord between husband and wife. On this account it was recommended as the stone to be set in wedding (or espousal) rings—not on account of its beauty therefore, which was described by Isidore of Seville as a small stone devoid of beauty.

In more recent times a Parisian Oracle of mystic subjects, the Baron d'Orchamps, announced the diamond, if worn on the left (hand) warded off evil influences and attracted good fortune and since he had fashionable clients the word spread and the wearing of the diamond on the left hand became in itself a fashion.

One of the first uses of the diamond engagement or wedding ring is for the marriage of Maximilian I, then Archduke of Austria, to Mary of Burgundy in 1477. Other early examples of betrothal jewels incorporating diamonds include the Bridal Crown of Blanche (c. 1370–1380) and the Heftlein brooch of Vienna (c. 1430–1440), a pictorial piece depicting a wedding couple.

The popularity of the diamond ring as an engagement ring for a much wider audience can be traced directly to the marketing campaigns of De Beers, starting in 1938. The campaign had become necessary to sell the many diamonds suddenly available because of large diamond finds, particularly in South Africa. In the early 20th century, a chairman of De Beers said that the diamond trade would prosper "so long as men are foolish and women are vain."

Today, the round brilliant is still the most popular diamond shape for an engagement ring; more than 60 percent of diamonds sold are brilliants.

The increase in online sales is disrupting the market for diamonds by bringing greater transparency to an industry that has traditionally relied on opacity. Online diamond retailers and e-commerce platforms include Blue Nile, Brilliant Earth, and Costco.

== Blood diamonds ==
In some of the politically unstable central African and west African countries, revolutionary groups have taken control of diamond mines, using proceeds from diamond sales to finance their operations. Diamonds sold through this process are known as conflict diamonds or blood diamonds. Major diamond trading corporations continue to fund and fuel these conflicts by doing business with armed groups. In response to public concerns that their diamond purchases were contributing to war and human rights abuses in central Africa and West Africa, the United Nations, the diamond industry and diamond-trading nations introduced the Kimberley Process in 2002, which is aimed at ensuring that conflict diamonds do not become intermixed with the diamonds not controlled by such rebel groups, by providing documentation and certification of diamond exports from producing countries to ensure that the proceeds of sale are not being used to fund criminal or revolutionary activities. Although the Kimberley Process has been moderately successful in limiting the number of conflict diamonds entering the market, conflict diamonds smuggled to market continue to persist to some degree (about 2–3% of diamonds traded in 2000 were possible conflict diamonds). Today, according to the Gemological Institute of America, 99% of the world's diamonds are conflict-free. According to the 2006 book The Heartless Stone, two major flaws still hinder the effectiveness of the Kimberley Process: the relative ease of smuggling diamonds across African borders and giving phony histories, and the violent nature of diamond mining in nations that are not in a technical state of war and whose diamonds are therefore considered "clean".

The Canadian Government has set up a body known as Canadian Diamond Code of Conduct to help authenticate Canadian diamonds. This tracking system of diamonds helps protect the "conflict free" label of Canadian diamonds.

Currently, gem production totals nearly 30 million carats (6.0 tonnes; 6.6 short tons) of cut and polished stones annually, and over 100 million carats (20 tonnes; 22 short tons) of mined diamonds are sold for industrial use each year, as are about 100 tonnes (110 short tons) of synthesized diamond.

== See also ==
- Antwerp diamond district
- Brown diamond
- Child labour in the diamond industry
- De Beers diamond monopoly
- Diamantaire
- List of diamonds
- List of largest rough diamonds

== Cited sources ==
- Dickinson, Joan Y. (2001). The Book of Diamonds. Dover Publications. ISBN 0-486-41816-2.
- Lee, Sunggyu (2006). Encyclopedia of Chemical Processing. CRC Press. ISBN 0-8247-5563-4.
- Wenk, Hans-Rudolf; et al. (2003). Minerals: Their Constitution and Origin. Cambridge University Press. ISBN 0-521-52958-1.
