= Romi =

Given name

Romi is a given name and may refer to:

- Romi Dames (born 1979), Japanese-American actress
- Romi Garduce (born 1969), Filipino mountain climber and IT Professional in Procter and Gamble Philippines
- Romi Goldmuntz (1882–1960), Belgian businessman who played an essential role in the survival of the diamond business in Antwerp
- Romi Mayes, Canadian musician
- Romi Park (born 1972), Japanese actress and voice actor
- Romi Paritzki (born 2004), Israeli world champion rhythmic gymnast
- Romi Ropati (born 1976), retired rugby union player best known for his time with the Highlanders Super Rugby franchise
- Romi Spada, Swiss bobsledder who competed in the early 1950s

== See also ==
- Return on marketing investment
- Romis
