= Beyt-e Bavi =

Beyt-e Bavi بيت باوي
- Village
- Location within Iran
- Coordinates: 31°05′52″N 49°21′08″E
- Country: Iran
- Province: Khuzestan
- County: Ramshir
- Bakhsh: Moshrageh
- Rural District: Moshrageh

Population (2006)
  - Total: 662
- Time zone: UTC+3:30 (IRST)
  - Summer (DST): UTC+4:30 (IRDT)

Beyt-e Bavi (Persian: بيت باوي, also Romanized as Beyt-e Bāvī; also known as Bāvi, Shamaklī, Shemālī, and Shomakelī) is a village in Moshrageh Rural District, Moshrageh District, Ramshir County, Khuzestan Province, Iran. At the 2006 census, its population was 662, in 99 families.
