= Shaveh-ye Beyt Mansur =

Shaveh-ye Beyt Mansur شاوه بيت منصور
- Village
- Country: Iran
- Province: Khuzestan
- County: Ramshir
- Bakhsh: Moshrageh
- Rural District: Moshrageh

Population (2006)
  - Total: 168
- Time zone: UTC+3:30 (IRST)
  - Summer (DST): UTC+4:30 (IRDT)

Shaveh-ye Beyt Mansur (Persian: شاوه بيت منصور, also Romanized as Shāveh-ye Beyt Manṣūr) is a village in Moshrageh Rural District, Moshrageh District, Ramshir County, Khuzestan Province, Iran. At the 2006 census, its population was 168, in 33 families.
