= Beyt-e Seyvan =

Beyt-e Seyvan بيت سيوان
- Village
- Location within Iran
- Coordinates: 31°09′35″N 49°16′52″E
- Country: Iran
- Province: Khuzestan
- County: Ramshir
- Bakhsh: Moshrageh
- Rural District: Moshrageh

Population (2006)
  - Total: 306
- Time zone: UTC+3:30 (IRST)
  - Summer (DST): UTC+4:30 (IRDT)

Beyt-e Seyvan (Persian: بيت سيوان, also Romanized as Beyt-e Seyvān; also known as Shāveh Seyvān, Shāveh-ye Seyvān, and Shāveh-ye Şeyvān) is a village in Moshrageh Rural District, Moshrageh District, Ramshir County, Khuzestan Province, Iran. At the 2006 census, its population was 306, in 57 families.
