= Moeydeleh-ye Sofla =

Moeydeleh-ye Sofla معيدله سفلي
- Village
- Location within Iran
- Coordinates: 31°06′47″N 49°19′49″E
- Country: Iran
- Province: Khuzestan
- County: Ramshir
- Bakhsh: Moshrageh
- Rural District: Moshrageh

Population (2006)
  - Total: 273
- Time zone: UTC+3:30 (IRST)
  - Summer (DST): UTC+4:30 (IRDT)

Moeydeleh-ye Sofla (Persian: معيدله سفلي, also Romanized as Mo‘eydeleh-ye Soflá and Mo‘edeleh-ye Soflá) is a village in Moshrageh Rural District, Moshrageh District, Ramshir County, Khuzestan Province, Iran. At the 2006 census, its population was 273, in 47 families.
