= Hoseyniyeh-ye Olya =

Hoseyniyeh-ye Olya حسينيه عليا
- Village
- Location within Iran
- Coordinates: 30°57′07″N 49°26′01″E
- Country: Iran
- Province: Khuzestan
- County: Ramshir
- Bakhsh: Moshrageh
- Rural District: Azadeh

Population (2006)
  - Total: 216
- Time zone: UTC+3:30 (IRST)
  - Summer (DST): UTC+4:30 (IRDT)

Hoseyniyeh-ye Olya (Persian: حسينيه عليا, also Romanized as Ḩoseynīyeh-ye ‘Olyā; also known as Ḩoseynīyeh-ye Fajer) is a village in Azadeh Rural District, Moshrageh District, Ramshir County, Khuzestan Province, Iran. At the 2006 census, its population was 216, in 39 families.
