= Moeydeleh-ye Olya =

Moeydeleh-ye Olya معيدله عليا
- Village
- Location within Iran
- Coordinates: 31°07′16″N 49°21′55″E
- Country: Iran
- Province: Khuzestan
- County: Ramshir
- Bakhsh: Moshrageh
- Rural District: Azadeh

Population (2006)
  - Total: 33
- Time zone: UTC+3:30 (IRST)
  - Summer (DST): UTC+4:30 (IRDT)

Moeydeleh-ye Olya (Persian: معيدله عليا, also Romanized as Mo‘eydeleh-ye ‘Olyā; also known as Mo‘edeleh-ye ‘Olyā, Mollā Dāvod, and Mollā Dāvūd) is a village in Azadeh Rural District, Moshrageh District, Ramshir County, Khuzestan Province, Iran. At the 2006 census, its population was 33, in 8 families.
