= Shamlan =

Shamlan may refer to:

- Shamlan, Iran
- Shamlan, Yemen
