= MyGemma =

Diamond recycling company

myGemma
- Type: Private
- Industry: E-commerce, resale
- Founded: 2018; 8 years ago
- Headquarters: New York City, United States
- Key people: Andrew Brown (CEO)
- Services: Resale of pre-owned luxury goods
- Revenue: ▲US$30 million (2022)
- Parent: WP Diamonds
- Website: mygemma.com

myGemma (originally WP Diamonds) is an American resale marketplace for pre-owned luxury goods, primarily handbags and jewelry. It was established in 2012 by Andrew Brown as a diamond and jewelry buying company, and is headquartered in New York City.

== History ==
Originally, a wholesaler and seller on several third party marketplaces like eBay, 1stDibs, and others, the platform was launched in February 2012 by Andrew Brown as a part of the consumer division of White Pine Trading, a recycled and fine-jewelry company.

WP Diamond's online purchasing system allows customers from around the world to submit information about their diamond, watch or jewelry online and receive a price quote. Customers then send their items in or schedule an appointment to receive a final price offer.

A month after the creation of WP Diamonds' online purchasing system, they expanded into the United Kingdom opening their first offices in Birmingham. At this time WP Diamonds also operated from offices in Barcelona, Spain and in 2013 WP Diamonds expanded their operations into Canada, where they began purchasing GIA and international laboratory certified diamonds from Canadian citizens. In 2018, WP Diamonds launched in Asia opening an office in Hong Kong.

By the end of 2012, Rough & Polished claimed that WP Diamonds' had become one of the largest dedicated diamond recycling companies. It was stated during an interview with Professional Jeweller, that the company would be selling the Recycled Diamonds to jewelry retailers, jewelry manufacturers, diamond manufacturers and diamond dealers.

In 2014, WP Diamonds received an A+ rating from the Better Business Bureau and announced they would also be offering a purchasing solution for used watches and designer jewelry. In addition, WP Diamonds claims on their website to have traded approximately $75 million of recycled diamonds and diamond jewelry in 2014.

In 2018, they opened myGemma an online platform selling pre-owned luxury.

In 2019, they launched their handbag buying division and in 2020 they launched their sneaker buying division.

=== myGemma ===
In November 2018, it launched Gemma by WP Diamonds to resell items acquired through its buying operation.

In February 2020, myGemma launched handbags as a product category.

In October 2023, the WP Diamonds consumer website was merged into myGemma. It began selling products by livestreaming on TikTok. The company opened a showroom in Midtown Manhattan in New York in May 2024.

In February 2025, myGemma added a consignment service alongside its direct-purchase model, with consigned items listed on its website and on third-party marketplaces including Farfetch and 1stDibs.

The company acquires pre-owned luxury goods from consumers, who submit item details for a quote, and resells the items through its website.

== Recycling of diamonds ==
Its predecessor, WP Diamonds, recycled pre-owned diamonds and traded them back into the US jewelry market. They are typically purchased by jewelry manufacturers, diamond manufacturers, and dealers. Larger diamonds are handled by a number of certified bodies, but are also resold to a similar end user.
