= Zail =

Zail may refer to:

- Zail (British India), a revenue unit in British India, headed by the zaildar
- Zail Singh, president of India from 1982 to 1987
- Zail or Zeyl, village in Khuzestan, Iran

== See also ==
- Nikka Zaildar, a 2016 Indian Pujabi-language romantic comedy film by Simerjit Singh
  - Nikka Zaildar 2, its 2017 sequel
  - Nikka Zaildar 3, 2019 sequel to the 2017 film
