= Paygah-e Panjam Shakari =

Village in Khuzestan province, Iran

Paygah-e Panjam Shakari Persian: پايگاه پنجم شكاري
- Village
- Location within Iran
- Coordinates: 30°52′08″N 49°32′32″E
- Country: Iran
- Province: Khuzestan
- County: Ramshir
- District: Moshrageh
- Rural District: Azadeh

Population (2016)
  - Total: 1,674
- Time zone: UTC+3:30 (IRST)

Paygah-e Panjam Shakari (Persian: پايگاه پنجم شكاري) (Note: Also romanized as Pāygāh-e Panjam Shaḵārī) is a village in Azadeh Rural District of Moshrageh District, Ramshir County, Khuzestan province, Iran.

== Demographics ==
=== Population ===
At the time of the 2006 National Census, the village's population was 2,896 in 919 households. The following census in 2011 counted 2,618 people in 549 households. The 2016 census measured the population of the village as 1,674 people in 403 households. It was the most populous village in its rural district.
