= Muilheh-ye Olya =

Muilheh-ye Olya مويلحه عليا
- Village
- Location within Iran
- Coordinates: 30°54′00″N 49°35′00″E
- Country: Iran
- Province: Khuzestan
- County: Ramshir
- Bakhsh: Moshrageh
- Rural District: Azadeh

Population (2006)
  - Total: 252
- Time zone: UTC+3:30 (IRST)
  - Summer (DST): UTC+4:30 (IRDT)

Muilheh-ye Olya (Persian: مويلحه عليا, also Romanized as Mūīlḥeh-ye ‘Olyā; also known as Molḩeh-ye Bālā and Molḩeh-ye ‘Olyā) is a village in Azadeh Rural District, Moshrageh District, Ramshir County, Khuzestan Province, Iran. At the 2006 census, its population was 252, in 39 families.
