= Muilheh-ye Sofla =

Muilheh-ye Sofla مويلحه سفلي
- Village
- Location within Iran
- Coordinates: 30°53′59″N 49°35′29″E
- Country: Iran
- Province: Khuzestan
- County: Ramshir
- Bakhsh: Moshrageh
- Rural District: Azadeh

Population (2006)
  - Total: 334
- Time zone: UTC+3:30 (IRST)
  - Summer (DST): UTC+4:30 (IRDT)

Muilheh-ye Sofla (Persian: مويلحه سفلي, also Romanized as Mūīlḥeh-ye Soflá; also known as Molḩeh-ye Soflá and Moveylḩeh Pā’īn) is a village in Azadeh Rural District, Moshrageh District, Ramshir County, Khuzestan Province, Iran. At the 2006 census, its population was 334, in 59 families.
