= Eyn-e Yebareh =

Eyn-e Yebareh عين يباره
- Village
- Location within Iran
- Coordinates: 31°09′37″N 49°21′52″E
- Country: Iran
- Province: Khuzestan
- County: Ramshir
- Bakhsh: Moshrageh
- Rural District: Azadeh

Population (2006)
  - Total: 121
- Time zone: UTC+3:30 (IRST)
  - Summer (DST): UTC+4:30 (IRDT)

Eyn-e Yebareh (Persian: عين يباره, also Romanized as ‘Eyn-e Yebāreh; also known as Shāveh-ye ‘Eyn-e Yebāreh) is a village in Azadeh Rural District, Moshrageh District, Ramshir County, Khuzestan Province, Iran. At the 2006 census, its population was 121, in 28 families.
