= Muilheh-ye Vosta =

Muilheh-ye Vosta مويلحه وسطي
- Village
- Location within Iran
- Coordinates: 30°56′00″N 49°34′00″E
- Country: Iran
- Province: Khuzestan
- County: Ramshir
- Bakhsh: Moshrageh
- Rural District: Azadeh

Population (2006)
  - Total: 55
- Time zone: UTC+3:30 (IRST)
  - Summer (DST): UTC+4:30 (IRDT)

Muilheh-ye Vosta (Persian: مويلحه وسطي, also Romanized as Mūīlḥeh-ye Vostá; also known as Molḩeh-ye Mīānī and Molḩeh-ye Vostá) is a village in Azadeh Rural District, Moshrageh District, Ramshir County, Khuzestan Province, Iran. At the 2006 census, its population was 55, in 12 families.
