= Hoseyniyeh-ye Mir Shenan =

Hoseyniyeh-ye Mir Shenan حسينيه ميرشنان
- Village
- Country: Iran
- Province: Khuzestan
- County: Ramshir
- Bakhsh: Moshrageh
- Rural District: Azadeh

Population (2006)
  - Total: 123
- Time zone: UTC+3:30 (IRST)
  - Summer (DST): UTC+4:30 (IRDT)

Hoseyniyeh-ye Mir Shenan (Persian: حسينيه ميرشنان, also Romanized as Ḩoseynīyeh-ye Mīr Shenān) is a village in Azadeh Rural District, Moshrageh District, Ramshir County, Khuzestan Province, Iran. At the 2006 census, its population was 123, in 24 families.
