= Rumis, Iran =

Rumis روميس
- Village
- Location within Iran
- Coordinates: 31°03′35″N 49°24′20″E
- Country: Iran
- Province: Khuzestan
- County: Ramshir
- Bakhsh: Moshrageh
- Rural District: Moshrageh

Population (2006)
  - Total: 421
- Time zone: UTC+3:30 (IRST)
  - Summer (DST): UTC+4:30 (IRDT)

Rumis (Persian: روميس, also Romanized as Rūmīs; also known as Romeys, Romeyẕ, Romīs, and Romīş) is a village in Moshrageh Rural District, Moshrageh District, Ramshir County, Khuzestan Province, Iran. At the 2006 census, its population was 421, in 84 families.
