= Hoseyniyeh-ye Khazir =

Hoseyniyeh-ye Khazir حسينيه خضير
- Village
- Location within Iran
- Coordinates: 30°56′15″N 49°25′40″E
- Country: Iran
- Province: Khuzestan
- County: Ramshir
- Bakhsh: Moshrageh
- Rural District: Azadeh

Population (2006)
  - Total: 294
- Time zone: UTC+3:30 (IRST)
  - Summer (DST): UTC+4:30 (IRDT)

Hoseyniyeh-ye Khazir (Persian: حسينيه خضير, also Romanized as Ḩoseynīyeh-ye Khazīr and Ḩoseynīyeh-ye Kheẕayer) is a village in Azadeh Rural District, Moshrageh District, Ramshir County, Khuzestan Province, Iran. At the 2006 census, its population was 294, in 37 families.
