= Omm ol Sakhar, Ramshir =

Neighborhood in Khuzestan province, Iran

Omm ol Sakhar Persian: ام الصخر
- Neighborhood
- Location within Iran
- Coordinates: 31°00′39″N 49°26′38″E
- Country: Iran
- Province: Khuzestan
- County: Ramshir
- District: Moshrageh
- City: Moshrageh

Population (2006)
  - Total: 542
- Time zone: UTC+3:30 (IRST)

Omm ol Sakhar (Persian: ام الصخر) (Note: Also romanized as Omm ol Şakhar; also known as Omm oş Şakhar) is a neighborhood in the city of Moshrageh in Moshrageh District, Ramshir County, Khuzestan province, Iran.

== Demographics ==
=== Population ===
At the time of the 2006 National Census, Omm ol Sakhar's population was 542 in 101 households, when it was a village in Moshrageh Rural District.

After the census, the village of Moshrageh merged with the villages of Omm ol Sakhar and Sherkat-e Baneh, and was elevated to the status of a city.
