= Romeyleh-ye Sofla =

Romeyleh-ye Sofla رميله سفلي
- Village
- Location within Iran
- Coordinates: 30°58′07″N 49°26′43″E
- Country: Iran
- Province: Khuzestan
- County: Ramshir
- Bakhsh: Moshrageh
- Rural District: Azadeh

Population (2006)
  - Total: 137
- Time zone: UTC+3:30 (IRST)
  - Summer (DST): UTC+4:30 (IRDT)

Romeyleh-ye Sofla (Persian: رميله سفلي, also Romanized as Romeyleh-ye Soflá; also known as Romeyleh-ye Pā’īn) is a village in Azadeh Rural District, Moshrageh District, Ramshir County, Khuzestan Province, Iran. At the 2006 census, its population was 137, in 21 families.
