= Shaveh-ye Beyt Hamid =

Shaveh-ye Beyt Hamid شاوه بيت حميد
- Village
- Location within Iran
- Coordinates: 31°12′57″N 49°18′05″E
- Country: Iran
- Province: Khuzestan
- County: Ramshir
- Bakhsh: Moshrageh
- Rural District: Moshrageh

Population (2006)
  - Total: 124
- Time zone: UTC+3:30 (IRST)
  - Summer (DST): UTC+4:30 (IRDT)

Shaveh-ye Beyt Hamid (Persian: شاوه بيت حميد, also Romanized as Shāveh-ye Beyt Ḩamīd; also known as Beyt-e Ḩamīd, Shāhebī, Shāveh-ye Ḩamīd, and Shobeybī) is a village in Moshrageh Rural District, Moshrageh District, Ramshir County, Khuzestan Province, Iran. At the 2006 census, its population was 124, in 26 families.
