= Ud-e Taqi =

Ud-e Taqi عودتقي
- Village
- Location within Iran
- Coordinates: 31°08′06″N 49°21′42″E
- Country: Iran
- Province: Khuzestan
- County: Ramshir
- Bakhsh: Moshrageh
- Rural District: Azadeh

Population (2006)
  - Total: 170
- Time zone: UTC+3:30 (IRST)
  - Summer (DST): UTC+4:30 (IRDT)

Ud-e Taqi (Persian: عودتقي, also Romanized as ‘Ūd-e Taqī; also known as Shāveh-ye ‘Ūd-e Taqī) is a village in Azadeh Rural District, Moshrageh District, Ramshir County, Khuzestan Province, Iran. At the 2006 census, its population was 170, in 31 families.
