= Alvan-e Eshareh =

Alvan-e Eshareh علوان عشاره
- Village
- Location within Iran
- Coordinates: 31°08′11″N 49°23′49″E
- Country: Iran
- Province: Khuzestan
- County: Ramshir
- Bakhsh: Moshrageh
- Rural District: Azadeh

Population (2006)
  - Total: 185
- Time zone: UTC+3:30 (IRST)
  - Summer (DST): UTC+4:30 (IRDT)

Alvan-e Eshareh (Persian: علوان عشاره, also Romanized as Alvān-e Eshāreh and ‘Alāvān-e ‘Eshāreh; also known as Alwān) is a village in Azadeh Rural District, Moshrageh District, Ramshir County, Khuzestan Province, Iran. At the 2006 census, its population was 185, in 39 families.
