= Rapaport Auctions =

- Founded: 1976
- Founder: Martin Rapaport
- Type: Auction service
- Headquarters: New York, United States
- Services: Diamond and jewelry auctions
- Owner: Rapaport Group
- Key people: Martin Rapaport; Dan Mano (CEO, 2025-present)

Rapaport Auctions is an international diamond and jewelry auction platform. It is known for organizing monthly sealed-bid auctions of melee and single polished diamonds.

== Overview ==
Rapaport Auctions was founded as a subsidiary of Rapaport Group, by Martin Rapaport in 1976.

It conducts diamond melee and single-stone auctions. Melee auctions consist of parcels of small, uncertified polished diamonds typically under 0.2 carats each, sold in bulk lots with a total weight ranging from 30 to 500 carats. Many melee lots consist of recycled diamonds. Single-stone auctions involve individual loose diamonds ranging from 0.30 to over 5 carats. Both certified and uncertified diamonds are auctioned and disclosed as such to the bidder.

The service uses a sealed-bid, silent auction format with multi-day viewing sessions that allow buyers to inspect lots before placing bids. Participants are usually wholesalers, retailers, diamond dealers and pawnbrokers. Auctions are conducted in New York, Las Vegas, Antwerp, Ramat Gan, Dubai, Mumbai, Surat, and Hong Kong.

In December 2017, it handled the sale of the 709-carat Peace Diamond for Sierra Leone.
