= Shamlan, Iran =

Village in Khuzestan, Iran. shamlan saffron

Shamlan شملان
- Village
- Location within Iran
- Coordinates: 30°56′00″N 49°32′00″E
- Country: Iran
- Province: Khuzestan
- County: Ramshir
- Bakhsh: Moshrageh
- Rural District: Azadeh

Population (2006)
  - Total: 40
- Time zone: UTC+3:30 (IRST)
  - Summer (DST): UTC+4:30 (IRDT)

Shamlan (Persian: شملان, also Romanized as Shamlān) is a village in Azadeh Rural District, Moshrageh District, Ramshir County, Khuzestan Province, Iran. At the 2006 census, its population was 40, in 8 families.
