= Alvan-e Moslem =

Alvan-e Moslem علوان مسلم
- Village
- Country: Iran
- Province: Khuzestan
- County: Ramshir
- Bakhsh: Moshrageh
- Rural District: Azadeh

Population (2006)
  - Total: 183
- Time zone: UTC+3:30 (IRST)
  - Summer (DST): UTC+4:30 (IRDT)

Alvan-e Moslem (Persian: علوان مسلم, also Romanized as ʿAlvān-e Moslem) is a village in Azadeh Rural District, Moshrageh District, Ramshir County, Khuzestan Province, Iran. At the 2006 census, its population was 183, in 36 families.
