= Sierra Leone Diamond (Kono region) =

Diamond

The Peace Diamond
- Weight: 709 carats (141.8 g)
- Country of origin: Sierra Leone
- Discovered: March 2017
- Original owner: Emmanuel Momoh
- Owner: Emmanuel Momoh

The Sierra Leone Diamond is a 709-carat, alluvial diamond found in 2017 by workers hired by Pastor Emmanuel Momoh in river sediment in Koidu village, Kono district, Sierra Leone. It has since been renamed The Peace Diamond.

== Discovery ==
The Peace Diamond was discovered on 13 March 2017 by a team of five diamond miners. The miners brought the diamond to Pastor Emmanuel Momoh, manager of the Majestic Exploration & Mining Company Limited and owner of the mineral concession licence.

Momoh found the diamond while searching through river sediment in a community artisanal licence area belonging to the community of Koyardu Village within the mineral exploration concession licence of Majestic Exploration & Mining Company Limited. He is not a professional diamond hunter. He looks for diamonds as a freelancer or artisanal diamond hunter. Momoh said that he had the option of fleeing to Belgium with the diamond using the help of a local dealer. However, he handed over the diamond to the government with the hope that it would help increase recent development in the country, and especially the impoverished Kono district.

== The diamond ==
The uncut found diamond is slightly smaller than a hockey puck. It is one of the twentieth largest ever found and the largest discovered in the past forty years. It is the second largest found in Sierra Leone, the largest being the Star of Sierra Leone, a 968.9-ct diamond discovered in 1972. The diamond appears to have a reddish stain coating it. The Ministry of Mines and Mineral Resources has attempted to clean it by "boiling (it) in hydrofluoric acid and nitric acid for 72 hours".

== Auction ==
Ernest Bai Koroma, president of Sierra Leone, stated that the Ministry of Mines was given "clear instruction to the Ministry of Mines that the evaluation, sale and distribution of the proceeds must be done in the most transparent manner." He also said that Momoh, who is officially its present owner, would be given a certain amount of the proceeds after the diamond is sold at auction. Momoh has been involved in the weighing, cleaning, and bidding of the stone, and states that he is satisfied with the transparency of the process.

The diamond is now in a safe at the Bank of Sierra Leone, Sierra Leone's central bank in Freetown.

By April 5, 2017, there had only been six offers for the diamond. In response, the deadline was extended to May 10. The diamond was bought by Graff Diamonds in December 2017 for $6.5M USD via auction. The diamond auction was facilitated by The Rapaport Auctions, a corporation specializing in diamond trade.

== Pastor Emmanuel Momoh ==
Pastor Emmanuel Momoh was born on December 25, 1975. He comes from the Idah Local Government area in Kogi State, Nigeria, and is of the Igala tribe.

Momoh graduated from Federal Polytechnic, Idah where he received a National Diploma in electrical and electronics engineering. He then graduated from Kaduna Polytechnic where he received his Higher National Diploma in Electronics and Telecommunications Engineering.

He currently owns and manages a computer service company in Lokoja and is an Evangelical preacher.

On October 3, 2015, Momoh was ordained and became Pastor by the general overseer, Bishop (Dr.) John Ibenu. He is currently serving at the Headquarters Church, Adankolo New layout, Lokoja, Kogi state.

Momoh is married to Rose I. Momoh. They have three children, Mercy, Deborah and Joan.

== See also ==
- List of diamonds
