= Romi Goldmuntz =

Belgian businessman

Benjamin (Romi) Goldmuntz (Kraków, 8 July 1882 - Antwerp, 13 May 1960) was a Belgian businessman who played an essential role in the survival of the diamond business in Antwerp. In 1920, his diamond company employed about 600 workers. Romi and his brother Léopold were important customers of the Diamond Trading Company (DTC, a subsidiary of De Beers). After World War I, in 1918 he persuaded the people who had lived in exile in the Netherlands during the war, to return to Antwerp. He succeeded again after World War II in 1945, to convince those living in New York to return to Belgium. Romi Goldmuntz also founded the Diamond Office in Antwerp. The cultural center Romi Goldmuntz Center and the Great Synagogue Romi Goldmuntz in Antwerp are named after him.

== See also ==
- World Federation of Diamond Bourses

== Sources ==
- Belgian Jewish Heritage
- Diamond cutter
