= Moshrageh, Ramshir =

City in Khuzestan province, Iran

Moshrageh Persian: مشراگه
- City
- Location within Iran
- Coordinates: 31°00′33″N 49°26′15″E
- Country: Iran
- Province: Khuzestan
- County: Ramshir
- District: Moshrageh
- Established as a municipality: 2010

Population (2016)
  - Total: 2,095
- Time zone: UTC+3:30 (IRST)

Moshrageh (Persian: مشراگه) (Note: Also romanized as Meshrāgeh, Moshārageh, and Moshrāgeh; also known as Moshāregheh) is a city in, and the capital of, Moshrageh District of Ramshir County, Khuzestan province, Iran. It also serves as the administrative center for Moshrageh Rural District. As a village, it was the capital of Azadeh Rural District until its capital was transferred to the village of Romeyleh-ye Olya.

== Demographics ==
=== Population ===
At the time of the 2006 National Census, Moshrageh's population was 947 in 171 households, when it was a village in Moshrageh Rural District. The following census in 2011 counted 1,793 people in 453 households, by which time it had merged with the villages of Omm ol Sakhar and Sherkat-e Baneh, and was elevated to the status of a city. The 2016 census measured the population of the city as 2,095 people in 564 households.
