= Mazandeh =

Mazandeh مزنده
- Village
- Location within Iran
- Coordinates: 31°08′24″N 49°21′16″E
- Country: Iran
- Province: Khuzestan
- County: Ramshir
- Bakhsh: Moshrageh
- Rural District: Azadeh

Population (2006)
  - Total: 90
- Time zone: UTC+3:30 (IRST)
  - Summer (DST): UTC+4:30 (IRDT)

Mazandeh (Persian: مزنده; also known as Abū Sa‘īd-e Sabbāned-e Yek, Abū Sa‘īd-e Sabbāneh-ye Yek, and Shāveh-ye Mazzandeh) is a village in Azadeh Rural District, Moshrageh District, Ramshir County, Khuzestan Province, Iran. At the 2006 census, its population was 90, in 18 families.
