= Antwerp Diamond Trade Fair =

The Antwerp Diamond Trade Fair (ADTF) is an international trade fair dedicated exclusively to loose polished diamonds. The fair was rebranded and renamed to BrilliAnt in 2017.

== Description ==
The Antwerp diamond district's leading firms and various foreign firms exhibit high-quality natural diamonds of a variety of cuts and sizes, from white diamonds to natural fancy colour diamonds. Buyers from jewellery manufacturers and retailers visit the show to source stones and to re-stock. The fair is known for its wide selection of diamonds, competitive pricing and services. Entry to ADTF is by pre-registration only.

BrilliAnt will have networking events and seminars. The "Antwerp Diamond Night", an entertainment evening and dinner for exhibitors and buyers, takes place in Antwerp on the first evening of the show. Visitors to ADTF in recent editions have included jewellers from Place Vendôme in Paris, London, Milan, Madrid, Montreal, New York, Los Angeles, Moscow, Dubai and Hong Kong.

== See also ==
- Diamond Trading Company
