= Abdollah-e Amuri =

Village in Khuzestan province, Iran

Abdollah-e Amuri Persian: عبداله عموري
- Village
- Location within Iran
- Coordinates: 31°08′20″N 49°18′06″E
- Country: Iran
- Province: Khuzestan
- County: Ramshir
- District: Moshrageh
- Rural District: Moshrageh

Population (2016)
  - Total: 1,164
- Time zone: UTC+3:30 (IRST)

Abdollah-e Amuri (Persian: عبداله عموري) (Note: Also romanized as ‘Abdollāh-e ‘Amūrī; also known as Shāveh-ye ‘Abdollāh-e Āmūrī) is a village in Moshrageh Rural District of Moshrageh District, Ramshir County, Khuzestan province, Iran.

== Demographics ==
=== Population ===
At the time of the 2006 National Census, the village's population was 687 in 122 households. The following census in 2011 counted 1,106 people in 232 households. The 2016 census measured the population of the village as 1,164 people in 273 households. It was the most populous village in its rural district.
