= Romeyleh-ye Olya =

Village in Khuzestan province, Iran

Romeyleh-ye Olya Persian: رميله عليا
- Village
- Location within Iran
- Coordinates: 30°58′21″N 49°27′09″E
- Country: Iran
- Province: Khuzestan
- County: Ramshir
- District: Moshrageh
- Rural District: Azadeh

Population (2016)
  - Total: 1,415
- Time zone: UTC+3:30 (IRST)

Romeyleh-ye Olya (Persian: رميله عليا) (Note: Also romanized as Romeyleh-ye ‘Olyā; also known as Ramīleh, Romeyleh, Romeyleh-ye Bālā, and Rumailah) is a village in, and the capital of, Azadeh Rural District of Moshrageh District, Ramshir County, Khuzestan province, Iran. The previous capital of the rural district was the village of Moshrageh, now a city.

== Demographics ==
=== Population ===
At the time of the 2006 National Census, the village's population was 1,191 in 211 households. The following census in 2011 counted 1,227 people in 327 households. The 2016 census measured the population of the village as 1,415 people in 378 households.
