= Marun Seh =

Marun Seh مارون سه
- Village
- Location within Iran
- Coordinates: 31°07′54″N 49°18′32″E
- Country: Iran
- Province: Khuzestan
- County: Ramshir
- Bakhsh: Moshrageh
- Rural District: Moshrageh

Population (2006)
  - Total: 69
- Time zone: UTC+3:30 (IRST)
  - Summer (DST): UTC+4:30 (IRDT)

Marun Seh (Persian: مارون سه, also Romanized as Mārūn Seh; also known as Shāveh-ye Mārūn-e Seh) is a village in Moshrageh Rural District, Moshrageh District, Ramshir County, Khuzestan Province, Iran. At the 2006 census, its population was 69, in 13 families.
