= Marun (name) =

Marun is a surname which is also used as a masculine given name. People with the name are as follows:

== Surname ==
- Carlos Marun (born 1960), Brazilian politician
- Lujo Marun (1857–1939), Croatian Franciscan priest and pioneer of Croatian archeology
- Nahim Marun, Brazilian pianist

== Given name ==
- Marun Al Naqqash (1855–1817), Sidon-born Maronite who produced the first theatre play texts in Arabic

== See also ==
- Marun
