= Namibia Diamond Trading Company =

- Founded: 2007

The Namibia Diamond Trading Company (NDTC) is a 50/50 joint venture between the Republic of Namibia and the DTC; the mining and sorting arm of De Beers. Namibia is a known source for gem quality diamonds and is the fourth-largest exporter of nonfuel minerals in Africa. In terms of scale, impact and economic importance, diamond mining is the most prominent industrial activity in Namibia.

== NDTC joint venture ==
The NDTC agreement and joint venture was reached in January 2007. According to the NDTC, the partnership was developed to promote diamond sorting, valuing, selling and marketing practices in Namibia through the exclusive use of domestically mined stones. It is estimated that 300 million in diamonds will be exported from Namibia in the calendar year 2009.

== NDTC environmental controversy ==
The origins of the NDTC joint venture were initiated in 1994 with a mineral right agreement between De Beers and the government of the Republic of Namibia, resulting in NamDeb (Namibia-De Beers). In 2007, the NDTC was formalised with the two principles agreeing to sustainable natural resource mining through Environmental Management Plans, which have been instituted at all NamDeb mining operations within Namibia. However, mining operations prior to the formalised agreement resulted in extensive environmental damage, including the removal of tidal habitat, destruction of flora and fauna through additional roads and towns, disposal of sediments in the ocean and its effects on marine life, proliferation of waste mounds, accumulation of waste in the form of machinery and buildings and the scarring of the desert through transport. To date, no funds have been set aside by NamDeb or the NDTC to retroactively repair or restore natural habitat damaged by diamond mining operations.

== NDTC siteholders ==
The NDTC, as with all DTC branches, allows companies known as siteholders to exclusively purchase supplies of domestically mined rough diamonds. The current siteholder contracts end in 2011, after which the siteholders will be re-evaluated by De Beers. Currently, there are ten wholesale and one retail NDTC siteholders, including:

Retail: Almod Diamonds Ltd.

Wholesale: NamGem, Finesse Diamond Corporation, Hardstone Processing, JKD Namibia, Namcot, LLD Diamonds (a part of the Leviev Group), Laurelton-Reign Diamonds, NU Diamond Manufacturing and Trau Bros. Diamonds Namibia.
