= Rapaport Diamond Report =

Price list for polished diamonds

The Rapaport Diamond Report, commonly referred to as the Rapaport Price List, Rap List, Rap Sheet or Diamond Price List is a subscription-based diamond price list published by the Rapaport Group.

== Overview ==
It is a diamond industry standard for the pricing of diamonds and was first issued by Martin Rapaport, the Rapaport Group founder, in 1978. The list provides benchmark asking prices for polished diamonds and is significantly used within the diamond trade as a reference for pricing and valuation. Rapaport also publishes the RapNet Diamond Price Index (RAPI), a daily price index for real-time polished diamond prices, listed on the diamond trading platform RapNet.

== Update ==
The report is updated every week on Thursday, at 11:59pm EST. The Rapaport Price List is copyrighted and available only to subscribers through tiered membership plans. Jewelers and diamond merchants use it to set prices for consumers. Consumers should therefore use the report with caution. These prices are used as the basis for standardization and negotiation of diamond prices around the world. Dealers and jewelers often quote prices as a percentage discount or premium relative to the Rapaport Price List.

The report is issued in the form of a table and prices diamonds based on their size, color and clarity. The report provides prices for individual diamonds and not diamonds sold in bulk. Each price list has four separate grids each one containing information for a different carat size for diamonds. Each grid has the clarity options on the horizontal line and the color options on the vertical line. In order to calculate the price of a diamond according to the Rapaport Price List, the size, color and clarity of the diamond is required. The listed price, based on this information, is given in hundreds of dollars per carat.

== See also ==
- Diamonds as an investment
- Antwerp Diamond Trade Fair
