= Kazi Sarwar Hossain =

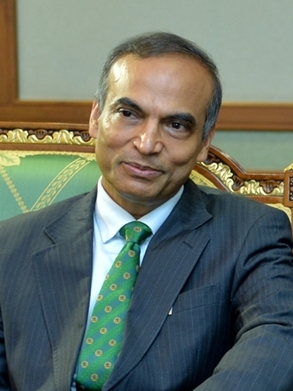
- Hossain in Malé (2016)

12th Director General of Bangladesh Coast Guard
- In office 1 April 2011 – 4 December 2013
- President: Zillur Rahman; Abdul Hamid
- Prime Minister: Sheikh Hasina
- Preceded by: A. S. M. A. Abedin
- Succeeded by: Makbul Hossain

Bangladesh High Commissioner to the Maldives
- In office 25 March 2015 – 5 December 2016
- President: Abdul Hamid
- Prime Minister: Sheikh Hasina
- Preceded by: Abdul Awal
- Succeeded by: Akhtar Habib

Personal details
- Education: University of Madras

Military service
- Allegiance: Bangladesh
- Branch/service: Bangladesh Navy; Bangladesh Coast Guard
- Years of service: 1980 - 2017
- Rank: Rear Admiral
- Commands: Commander, Khulna Naval Area (COMKHUL); Commodore, BNS Haji Mohshin
- Battles/wars: UNOCI

Kazi Sarwar Hossain is a retired rear admiral of the Bangladesh Navy and a former ambassador of Bangladesh to the Maldives. He is the former director general of the Bangladesh Coast Guard.

== Early life ==
Hossain did his MBA at Honolulu University. He completed defense studies at the University of Madras.

== Career ==
Hossain joined the Bangladesh Navy in 1980. He had served in the United Nations Operation in Côte d'Ivoire.

In April 2011, Hossain, as director general of the Coast Guard, received three patrol crafts transferred from the Bangladesh Navy.

In January 2015, Hossain was appointed the ambassador of Bangladesh to the Maldives, where he replaced Rear Admiral Abu Sayed Mohammad Abdul Awal. He left the post the next year after a farewell call on Vice President Abdulla Jihad of the Maldives.

In March 2022, Hossain identified China and the United States as key players in the Bay of Bengal. He was the second keynote speaker. He is an adviser of the Bangladesh Institute of Maritime Research and Development.
