= Alwan (surname) =

Alwan is a surname.

Notable people with the surname include:

- Abeer Alwan, American speech processing researcher
- Ahmad Salah Alwan (born 1982), Iraqi footballer
- Amer Alwan (1957–2023), Iraqi-French film director and actor
- Jassem Alwan (born 1928), Syrian Army colonel
- Nisreen Alwan, British–Iraqi public health researcher
- Sahim Alwan, Yemeni-American arrestee
- Yahya Alwan (born 1956), Iraqi national and Olympic coach
