= Nisreen Alwan =

British–Iraqi public health researcher

Nisreen Ala-Din A S Alwan
- Education: University of Nottingham; University of Leeds; University of Baghdad
- Awards: 100 Women (BBC)
- Scientific career
- Workplaces: University of Southampton
- Thesis: The effect of maternal iron status and intake during pregnancy on cardiovascular disease risk in the offspring. (2014)

Nisreen Ala-Din A. S. Alwan is a British–Iraqi public health researcher who is a professor of Public Health at the University of Southampton. Her research considers maternal and child health. During the COVID-19 pandemic, Alwan used social media to communicate public health messages and to call for long covid to be counted and measured. In 2020, Alwan was selected as one of the BBC's top 100 Women.

== Early life and education ==
Alwan studied medicine at the University of Baghdad. During her studies she became interested in public health, and pursued a graduate degree in public health at the University of Nottingham. She joined the public health training programme in Yorkshire and the Humber, during which she was awarded a Wellcome Trust training fellowship. Alwan went on to earn a master's degree in statistical epidemiology and doctorate in nutritional epidemiology.

== Research and career ==
Alwan studies maternal and child health focusing on obesity and birth outcomes.

In the early days of the COVID-19 pandemic, Alwan became infected with coronavirus. This experience inspired her to become a more public-facing health campaigner. In particular, she made use of Twitter to communicate public health messages, and to lead a call for long covid to be counted and reported in national data. Her efforts resulted in the broader medical community paying more attention to long COVID and how it presented clinically. She was part of a group of medics who wrote a letter to the government asking them to improve research and surveillance of long COVID. She wrote several opinion articles for Nature, The Huffington Post, The Lancet and The BMJ.

She did lament in 2022 that data showed long covid cases in children to be more of a problem than theorized. Alwan supported the efforts of the Scotland branch of the Long Covid Kids charity.

She has also spoken out about equality of treatment of women and ethnic minorities in academia and the public sphere.

== Awards and honours ==
- 2020 100 Women (BBC)
- Member of the Order of the British Empire in the 2021 New Year Honours

== Selected publications ==
- Alwan, Nisreen (2020). "A negative COVID-19 test does not mean recovery". Nature. 584 (170): 170. Bibcode:2020Natur.584..170A. doi:10.1038/d41586-020-02335-z. PMID 32782377. S2CID 221110462.
- Nykjaer, Camilla; Alwan, Nisreen A.; Greenwood, Darren C.; Simpson, Nigel A. B.; Hay, Alastair W. M.; White, Kay L. M.; Cade, Janet E. (1 June 2014). "Maternal alcohol intake prior to and during pregnancy and risk of adverse birth outcomes: evidence from a British cohort". J Epidemiol Community Health. 68 (6): 542–549. doi:10.1136/jech-2013-202934. ISSN 0143-005X. PMC 4033207. PMID 24616351.
- Alwan, N. A.; Greenwood, D. C.; Simpson, N. A. B.; McArdle, H. J.; Godfrey, K. M.; Cade, J. E. (7 February 2011). "Dietary iron intake during early pregnancy and birth outcomes in a cohort of British women". Human Reproduction. 26 (4): 911–919. doi:10.1093/humrep/der005. ISSN 0268-1161. PMC 3057752. PMID 21303776.
- Alwan, Nisreen; Tuffnell, Derek J; West, Jane (8 July 2009). "Treatments for gestational diabetes". Cochrane Database of Systematic Reviews. 2009 (3) CD003395. doi:10.1002/14651858.cd003395.pub2. ISSN 1465-1858. PMC 7154381. PMID 19588341.
