= Diamond Trading Company =

Rough diamonds sales and distribution arm of De Beers

- Industry: Sale of rough (uncut) diamonds
- Headquarters: Johannesburg, South Africa
- Area served: Worldwide
- Key people: Paul Rowley, Managing Director
- Products: Diamonds
- Services: Rough diamond sales
- Parent: De Beers (50% with government in each country with an office)
- Website: www.dtc.com

The Diamond Trading Company (DTC) is the rough diamond sales and distribution arm of the De Beers Group. The DTC sorts, values and sells about 35% of the world’s rough diamonds by value. The DTC has a combination of wholly owned and joint venture operations in South Africa (DBSSSA), Botswana (DTCB and DBGSS), and Namibia (NDTC).

== Overview ==
The DTC sells diamonds that are sourced from De Beers' mining operations in South Africa and Canada, and through its partnerships with the governments of Botswana and Namibia. Sorters in Johannesburg, Windhoek and Gaborone sort these diamonds into approximately 12,000 different categories based on size, shape, quality and colour. DTC clients are known as Sightholders. The DTC also develops and produces diamond technology, which ensures consistency of DTC rough diamond assortments for its Sightholder clients.

The DTC’s Sightholders are required to comply with the De Beers’s Best Practice Principles (BPP)s which set out various objective standards of conduct within three main areas – Business responsibilities; Social responsibilities; Environmental responsibilities. The BPPs ensure that the De Beers Group, DTC Sightholders and applicable third parties are operating to the specific ethical, legal, professional, social and environmental standards. The DTC also requires its clients to be 100% committed to the Kimberley Process.

The Kimberley Process started when Southern African diamond-producing countries met in Kimberley, South Africa, in May 2000, to discuss ways to stop the trade of ‘conflict diamonds’ and ensure that diamond purchases were not funding violence or terrorism activities. In December 2000, the United Nations General Assembly adopted a landmark resolution supporting the creation of an international certification scheme for rough diamonds. By November 2002, negotiations between governments, the international diamond industry and civil society organisations resulted in the creation of the Kimberley Process Certification Scheme (KPCS). The KPCS sets out the requirements for controlling rough diamond production and trade. The KPCS became effective in 2003.

== See also ==
- Diamonds
- Kimberley Process
- Diamonds (gemstone)
- Diamonds as an investment
