= Al-Husseiniya District =

Al-Husseiniya District Istiqlal
- District
- Country: Iraq
- Governorate: Baghdad Governorate

Area
  - Total: 30 km^{2} (12 sq mi)

Population (2015)
  - Total: 1,500,000
- Time zone: UTC+3 (AST)

Al-Husseiniya District is an area of the Baghdad Governorate, Iraq.
