= Hoseynieh-ye Sar Bardian =

Hoseynieh-ye Sar Bardian حسينيه سربرديان
- Village
- Country: Iran
- Province: Kohgiluyeh and Boyer-Ahmad
- County: Charam
- Bakhsh: Central
- Rural District: Alqchin

Population (2006)
  - Total: 52
- Time zone: UTC+3:30 (IRST)
  - Summer (DST): UTC+4:30 (IRDT)

Hoseynieh-ye Sar Bardian (Persian: حسينيه سربرديان, also Romanized as Ḩoseynīeh-ye Sar Bardīān) is a village in Alqchin Rural District, in the Central District of Charam County, Kohgiluyeh and Boyer-Ahmad Province, Iran. At the 2006 census, its population was 52, in 8 families.
