= Rameyleh, Hormozgan =

Romayleh رميله
- Village
- Location within Iran
- Coordinates: 26°52′53″N 53°35′17″E
- Country: Iran
- Province: Hormozgan
- County: Bandar Lengeh
- Bakhsh: Shibkaveh
- Rural District: Moqam

Population (2006)
  - Total: 175
- Time zone: UTC+3:30 (IRST)
  - Summer (DST): UTC+4:30 (IRDT)

Romayleh (Persian: رميله, also Romanized as Romeyleh and Romeileh; also known as Ramlah and Ramleh) is a village in Moqam Rural District, Shibkaveh District, Bandar Lengeh County, Hormozgan Province, Iran. At the 2006 census, its population was 175, in 33 families.
