= Alwan (newspaper) =

Former Sudanese newspaper

- Type: Daily newspaper
- Format: Print (formerly)
- Ceased publication: 2020
- Political alignment: Supported al-Turabi’s PCP
- Language: Arabic
- Headquarters: Sudan
- Circulation: 16,000 (2011)

Alwan was an Arabic-language newspaper in Sudan. It had a daily circulation of about 16,000 as of 2011 and generally supported al-Turabi's PCP. It was shut down in 2020 by the Sudanese government following the 2019 coup.
