= Marine Unsaturated Model =

The Marine Unsaturated Model (MARUN model) is a two-dimensional (vertical slice) finite element model capable of simulating the migration of water and solutes in saturated-unsaturated porous media while accounting for the impact of solute concentration on water density and viscosity, as saltwater is heaving and more viscous than freshwater. The detailed formulation of the MARUN model is found in (Boufadel et al. 1998) and (Boufadel et al. 1999). The model was used to investigate seepage flow in trenches and dams (Boufadel et al. 1999, Naba et al. 2002 ), the migration of brine following evaporation (Boufadel et al. 1999) and (Geng and M.C. 2015), submarine groundwater discharge (Li et al. 2008), and beach hydrodynamics to explain the persistence of some of the Exxon Valdez oil in Alaska beaches (Li and Boufadel 2010).

== Model formulation ==
In the absence of source/sink terms, the equation for the conservation of the fluid mass (water + salt) is:

$$\frac{\partial\left(\beta \phi S\right)}{\partial t*} = \frac{\partial\left(\beta \delta K_x* \frac{\partial \psi *}{\partial x*} \right)}{\partial x*} + \frac{\partial\left(\beta \delta K_z* \frac{\partial \psi *}{\partial z*} \right)}{\partial z*} + \frac{\partial\left({\beta}^2 K_z* \right)}{\partial z*}$$

where $\phi \left[ - \right]$ is the porosity of the medium() and S is the water saturation ratio of soil moisture with a value of 1 implying fully saturated soil,

In the absence of source/sink terms, the equation for the conservation of the solute equation is expressed as:

$$\frac{\partial \left( \phi S c* \right)}{\partial t*} = \triangledown \left( \phi S \underline{D}* \triangledown \cdot c* \right) - \triangledown \left( \underline{q}* c* \right)$$

== BIOMARUN ==
The model BIO-MARUN resulted from combining the model BIOB (for biodegradation in a block) with the MARUN model. The BIOB model (Geng et al. 2012) and (Geng et al. 2014) requires the concentration of hydrocarbons, the microbial density, and oxygen and nutrient concentrations. It uses Monod kinetics to predict microbial growth, oxygen consumption, and CO_{2} production. An implementation of the model was also conducted by (Torlapati and Boufadel 2014). The BIOB model can also revert to using default values.

The BIOMARUN model allows tracking of two substrates (or food), two microbial communities, and up to 8 solutes, and it was used to predict oil biodegradation under natural conditions (Geng et al. 2015) and with amendments (i.e., bioremediation) (Geng et al. 2016). The BIOMARUN model was also used to investigate the biodegradation of benzene in tidally influenced beaches (Geng et al. 2016)

== TMARUN ==
To account for heat transfer through liquid and vapor transport, the model MARUN was coupled with equations for the migration of heat through conduction and vapor transport as documented closely in (Geng and M.C. 2015, Geng et al. 2016). The TMARUN model was used to explain the presence of high salinity (100 g/L more than 3 times that of seawater) in the intertidal zone of beaches.
