= Long Covid Kids =

UK-based charity

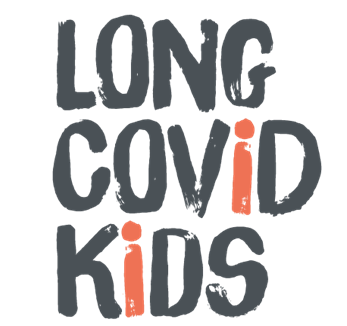
- Founded: October 2020
- Founder: Sammie McFarland
- Legal status: Charitable Organization
- Website: www.longcovidkids.org

Long Covid Kids is a UK-based charity that advocates for families, children and young people affected by Long Covid and related illnesses. Founded by Sammie McFarland in October 2020, the organization aims to raise awareness, provide support, and advocate for research and policy changes in favour of those impacted by long COVID.

== Background ==
The charity was established in response to the growing number of children experiencing prolonged symptoms following a COVID-19 infection. Sammie McFarland founded the charity with the support of a team of volunteers after her own daughter's struggle with long COVID. The group began with seven families, and once established, 300 more quickly reached out. By January 2022, the group involved more than 5,500 families, with around 100 to 120 new families joining them weekly. As of July 2024, the group's two chapters represented 11,000 families in the UK.

Helen Goss is the COO and Scotland Representative for the charity. She took legal action against the NHS for what she claimed was medical negligence towards her daughter suffering from long COVID.

== Activities ==
The charity raises awareness about the symptoms and impact of long COVID in children to aid early diagnosis and intervention. It also provides educational materials, online meet-ups, and signposting to healthcare professionals and support to children, young people, and their families.

In a survey conducted by psychologist Frances Simpson of Coventry University, also a co-founder of the group, parents were presented fifty symptoms to select which their children presented. Parents returned over 100 symptoms in their responses. The group advocated for more studies into the effects of long Covid in children, as well as trials to benefit children for medicine that had been shown to improve the condition of adults suffering with long Covid.

The charity aids the development of research through patient and public involvement and also advocates for an increase in funding for research to understand the long-term effects of long COVID on children and to develop effective treatments. Along with Long Covid Support, they published the first research available on reinfection effects in patients already treating long Covid, and have worked with Long Covid SOS and Pandemic Aid Networks to expose the flaws in research highly publicised by the media which suggested long Covid patients can recover within a year. The group requested the Scottish Government in 2022 allocate funds specifically for the care of children with long Covid, and noted the failure of medical professionals to treat the condition seriously.

It also advocates for informative public health campaigns, including appropriate mitigations in schools. The charity has supported the UK COVID inquiry and were core participants in Module 2. They applied for core status for Module 8, which is likely to be in 2026, but were denied in July 2024 by Baroness Hallett. McFarland and Goss have both stated the decision was not only disappointing but "echoes the UK government's disregard" for children with long Covid. That decision was later overturned.
