= Hoseyniyeh, Hormozgan =

Hoseyniyeh حسينه
- Village
- Location within Iran
- Coordinates: 26°39′13″N 54°21′54″E
- Country: Iran
- Province: Hormozgan
- County: Bandar Lengeh
- Bakhsh: Central
- Rural District: Moghuyeh

Population (2006)
  - Total: 811
- Time zone: UTC+3:30 (IRST)
  - Summer (DST): UTC+4:30 (IRDT)

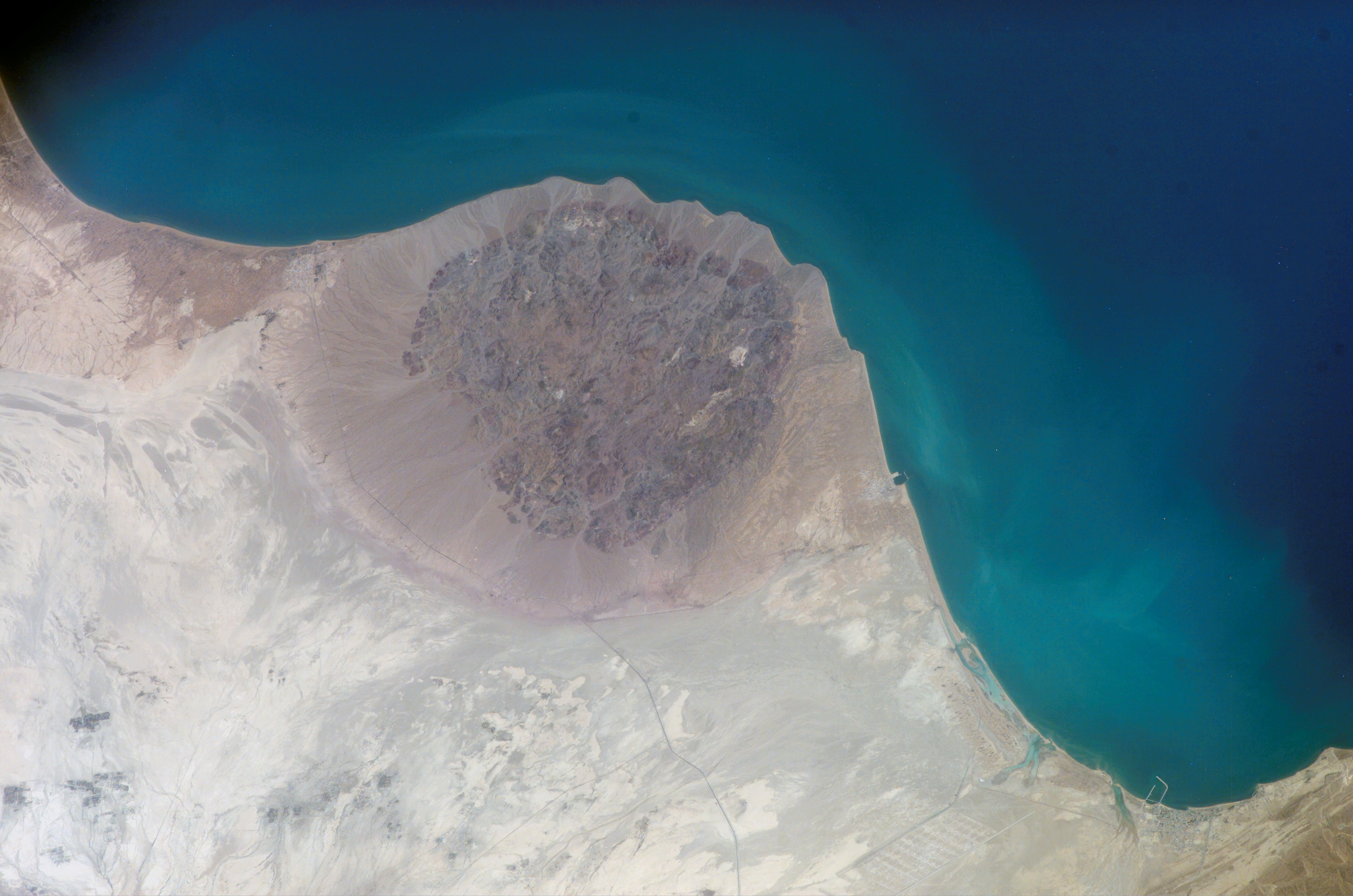
An orbital view of coastal terrain in Hormozgan, Iran, captured during International Space Station Expedition 15

Hoseyniyeh (Persian: حسينه, also Romanized as Ḩoseynīyeh; also known as Bandar-e Ḩoseynīyeh) is a village in Moghuyeh Rural District, in the Central District of Bandar Lengeh County, Hormozgan Province, Iran. At the 2006 census, its population was 811, in 153 families.
