= Abu Sayed Mohammad Abdul Awal =

Bangladeshi military person

Abdul Awal
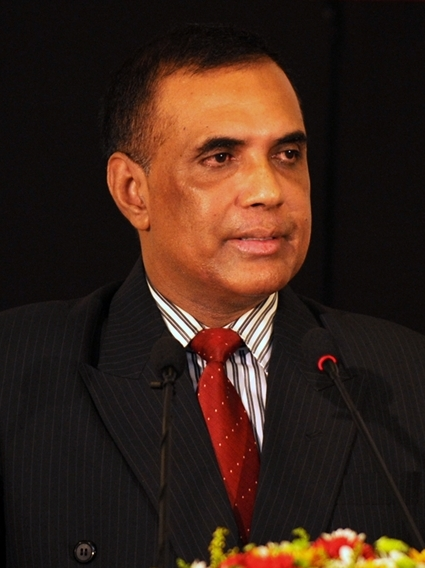
- Awal in Malé (2013)

Bangladesh High Commissioner to the Maldives
- In office 26 September 2010 – 14 December 2014
- President: Zillur Rahman; Abdul Hamid
- Prime Minister: Sheikh Hasina
- Preceded by: Selina Mohsin
- Succeeded by: Kazi Sarwar Hossain

Personal details
- Born: 1 January 1957 (age 69) Jamalpur, East Pakistan, Pakistan

Military service
- Allegiance: Bangladesh
- Branch/service: Bangladesh Navy
- Years of service: 1979-2015
- Rank: Rear Admiral
- Commands: Commodore Commanding BN Flotilla (COMBAN); Assistant Chief of Naval Staff (Operations); Assistant Chief of Naval Staff (Personnel)

Abu Sayed Mohammad Abdul Awal (Note: (G), ndc, psc, BN) (born 1957) is a retired two star officer of the Bangladesh Navy and former diplomat. He was assistant chief of naval staff personnel and operations. He was high commissioner to the Maldives.

== Early life ==
Awal was born on 1 January 1957 in Narundi, then in Mymensingh District of East Pakistan (now in Jamalpur District, Bangladesh). He was the eldest son of MA Wahed, an organiser of Bangladesh War of Liberation.

== Career ==
Awal joined the Bangladesh Navy in 1976 and was commissioned in 1979. He earned a Master of Defence Studies (MDS) from National University.

Awal commanded two frigates, a torpedo boat squadron, and other navy vessels. He was commandant of the Bangladesh Naval Academy. At navy headquarters he was director of naval operations, director of naval plans, and director of signals. He also served as commodore commanding BN flotilla (COMBAN). He was a defence advisor at the Bangladesh High Commission in Sri Lanka.

Commodore Awal was promoted to rear admiral on 29 September 2008. He was made assistant chief of naval staff (operations).

Awal was high commissioner to the Maldives from 26 September 2010 to 14 December 2015.

He retired on 31 December 2015.

== Personal life ==
Awal married Keya Awal and has one daughter.

== See also ==
- Military of Bangladesh
