= Martin Rapaport =

American diamond dealer

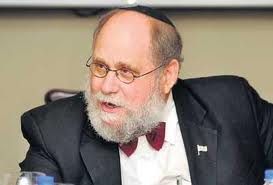
- Born: Belgium
- Occupation: Businessman

Martin Rapaport is the chairman of the Rapaport Group and founder of the Rapaport Diamond Report and Rapaport Trade (formerly RapNet), an online diamond trading network. Known for his influential role in the diamond industry, Rapaport has been both a pioneer and a controversial figure, advocating for price transparency, ethical sourcing, and the commoditization of diamonds. His work extends beyond market analysis to include contributions to addressing conflict diamonds, promoting Fair Trade practices, and engaging with non-governmental organizations on industry ethics.

== Career ==
Martin Rapaport began his work as an apprentice diamond cutter in Antwerp, Belgium. In 1978, he created the Rapaport Price List, which would later become a pivotal tool in the diamond industry. In 1980, he established RapNet, an electronic diamond trading network that further revolutionized the trade. Rapaport is an active member of several non-profit and diamond industry-related organizations, including the Jewelers for Children Charity Fund, the Diamond Manufacturers and Importers Association of America, and the Jewelers Vigilance Committee.

Rapaport is known for influencing the diamond industry, with his publication of the Rapaport Diamond Report in the late 1970s becoming the de facto pricing baseline for wholesale polished diamonds. While some credit this guide with reducing diamond prices during the commodities boom of the 1970s, others have criticized it for attempting to commoditize diamonds. In 1982, Rapaport's efforts to create a diamond commodity market through the New York Commodities Exchange failed, a result he attributed to the diamond industry's resistance to price transparency.

In the early 2000s, Rapaport turned his attention to ethical issues within the diamond industry. He traveled extensively to Sierra Leone to investigate the diamond market, leading to his advocacy for the Kimberley Process Certification Scheme, a United Nations-diamond industry partnership aimed at ending conflict diamonds. He has also promoted the concept of "Fair Trade Diamonds," working to create mining collectives in Sierra Leone and advocating for better labor conditions and equitable distribution of profits. His publication of "Guilt Trip," was quoted in the United States Congressional Record:

"Hundreds of millions of dollars of Sierra Leone diamonds are being traded on the world markets without any benefit going to the government or people of Sierra Leone. The real problem facing Sierra Leone is not merely how to share diamond resources among warring factions, but how to stop the illegal diamond industry from stealing the country's resources. But it goes beyond that. The bastards are not just stealing Sierra Leone's diamonds, they are trading them for guns. Guns which are used to kill people to keep the war going... The real challenge facing Sierra Leone and the world diamond trade, is how to stop this horrific murderous cycle of illegal diamond activity."

Rapaport continues to address ethical issues within the industry through his annual International Diamond Conference, where he brings together non-governmental organizations like Global Witness and Amnesty International to meet with diamond industry leaders. His work has also included efforts to support artisanal diggers in West Africa, offering them fair prices and advocating for the establishment of "development diamond" labels. Rapaport, in cooperation with the U.S. Agency for International Development and Global Witness, invested $60,000 of his own money to create four alluvial mining cooperatives in Sierra Leone, but ultimately sees "Fair-Trade" diamonds as the solution to West Africa's woes.

== Views ==
Martin Rapaport has been a controversial figure in the diamond industry, particularly for his outspoken views on pricing and the commoditization of diamonds. He argues that diamonds should be treated as a commodity, subject to the same laws of supply and demand as any other product, challenging the notion that diamonds are unique and should be valued individually based on specific characteristics. He has also been a proponent of viewing diamonds as an investment, emphasizing their durability and the increasing global wealth that drives demand for large stones.

Throughout his career, Rapaport has been a vocal critic of De Beers, accusing the company of manipulating diamond prices. Rapaport submitted papers in 2002 and in 2005 criticizing the European Commission's handling of investigations of collusion between De Beers and Russia's state-owned diamond cartel, ALROSA. He alleged the European body ignored evidence that ALROSA was selling diamonds to De Beers at prices 8 to 20 percent below market value and was aiding and abetting unethical and illegal business practices.

He has also criticized the creation and sale of synthetic diamonds, while acknowledging that they are another commodity that can be sold for whatever value the marketplace deems they are worth. However, he believes that consumers would desire a disclosure that a diamond they are buying is either lab-grown or mined.

== Criticism ==
Competitor diamond sellers have accused Rapaport of setting diamond prices too low, arguing that the methodology used to determine these prices is flawed or arbitrary. The Rapaport Diamond Corporation has also been criticized for publishing wholesale price guides for diamonds whilst allegedly trading diamonds directly to consumers. Some have gone further, accusing Rapaport of holding a monopoly on diamond grading through his association with the Gemological Institute of America.

His outspoken views on issues such as conflict diamonds, synthetic diamonds, diamond treatments, and Fair-Trade diamonds have been contentious, with competitors suggesting that his statements have had an impact on industry practices. Rapaport has also been seen as an unlikely ally to Non-Governmental Organizations in the diamond sector.

=== African People's Solidarity Committee ===
Criticism of Rapaport's efforts extends beyond industry insiders to activist groups like the African People's Solidarity Committee, who protested at the 2007 Rapaport International Diamond Conference in New York. They argued that "all diamonds are blood diamonds" and dismissed his efforts to support artisanal miners:

"The African People's Solidarity Committee rejects this public relations ploy. They are calling for nothing less than all of Africa's resources under the control of the African working class itself. Africa is the richest continent on earth. Africans don't need charity; they need control over their own land."
