= Zeyl =

Zeyl ذيل
- Village
- Location within Iran
- Coordinates: 30°48′06″N 48°38′48″E
- Country: Iran
- Province: Khuzestan
- County: Shadegan
- Bakhsh: Central
- Rural District: Jaffal

Population (2006)
  - Total: 100
- Time zone: UTC+3:30 (IRST)
  - Summer (DST): UTC+4:30 (IRDT)

Zeyl (Persian: ذيل, also Romanized as Z̄eyl, Zīyel, and 'Z̄a’īl; also known as Z̄eyl Omm oş Şakhar) is a village in Jaffal Rural District, in the Central District of Shadegan County, Khuzestan Province, Iran. At the 2006 census, its population was 100, in 19 families.
