= Diamonds as an investment =

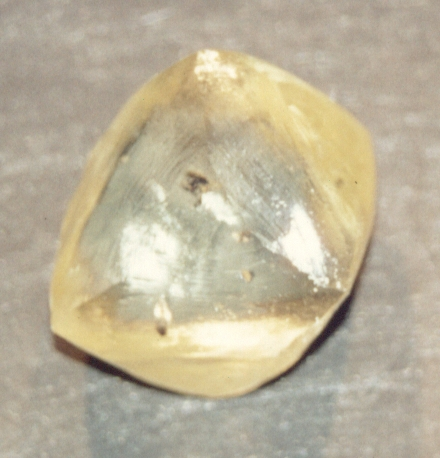
An uncut diamond, not showing the prized optical properties of cut and polished versions

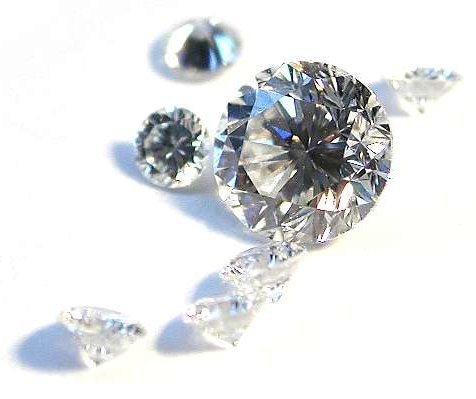
Popular brilliant cut

Diamonds were largely inaccessible to investors until the recent advent of regulated commodities, due to a lack of price discovery and transparency. The characteristics of individual diamonds, especially the carat weight, color and clarity, have significant impact on values, but transactions were always private. With the standardized commodity as an underlying asset, several market traded financial instruments have been announced.

By 2025 diamond prices had dropped significantly, and were expected to continue dropping.

== Market prices ==
Diamond prices are influenced by global trends. The largest markets are USA (about half), China and India. As of 2017 larger diamonds had appreciated in value since 2008 more than smaller ones.

In early 2025 diamond prices had dropped significantly from a peak in 2022; prices of natural gems in shops dropped by 26% by the beginning of 2025. Laboratory-grown diamonds had dropped by 74% since 2020. Prices were expected to continue decreasing. De Beers had started 2024 with US$2bn worth of diamonds, which it had not sold by the end of the year. The company cut production by 20%, and its owner, Anglo American, was seeking to sell it. Causes for the continuing decline were suggested as lower demand in China, the general global economy, and fewer marriages, but improvement in speed of laboratory growing of diamonds from weeks (and billions of years for natural stones) to hours was thought to be the biggest change. Historian of jewellery Jack Ogden said "It's a very artificial market. They're very valuable because people want to pay money for them. People want to pay money for them because they're very valuable", but that this self-sustaining loop might not always continue to sustain itself.

=== Variability and fluctuations ===
Polished diamond prices vary widely depending on a diamond's carat, color, clarity and cut, sometimes referred to as the 4 Cs. In contrast to precious metals, there is no universal world price per gram for diamonds. The industry refers to price guides.

Rough diamond prices have historically been impacted by the mining companies controlling supply, most notably De Beers. However, after the dismantling of the De Beers cartel in 2001, the industry is now more fragmented, resulting in a higher percentage of diamond sales taking place in the form of auctions and other forms of open-market sales.

== Financial feasibility ==
=== Synthetic diamonds ===
Since the 1950s, techniques can produce gem-quality diamonds of essentially any desired chemistry in sizes up to about 1cm. Although some manufacturers do label their synthetic diamonds with serial numbers, there is no guarantee that a given diamond is not man-made, although sometimes an unnatural chemical composition or pattern of flaws may suggest a diamond is synthetic. It is much cheaper to produce diamonds through artificial synthesis than to mine them, although the cost is still significant. Laboratory-grown diamonds can be distinguished from natural ones by using advanced technical equipment, although difficult or impossible to distinguish by visual examination.

=== Polished diamonds ===
There are several factors contributing to low liquidity of diamonds. One of the main factors is the lack of terminal market. Most commodities have terminal markets, and some form of commodities exchange, clearing house, and central storage facilities. Until recently, this did not exist for diamonds. Diamonds are also subject to value added tax in the UK and EU, and sales tax in most other developed countries, therefore reducing their effectiveness as an investment medium. While most diamonds are sold through retail stores at high margin, investment diamonds are usually sold at auctions or privately.

Diamonds in larger sizes are rare, and their price is dependent on the individual features of the diamond. Fashion and marketing aspects can also cause fluctuations in price. This makes it difficult to establish a uniform and readily understood pricing system. Martin Rapaport produces the Rapaport Diamond Report, which lists prices for polished diamonds. The Rapaport Diamond Report is relatively expensive to subscribe to and, as such, is not readily available to consumers and investors. Each week, there are matrices of diamond prices for various shapes of brilliant cut diamonds, by colour and clarity within size bands. The price matrix for brilliant cuts alone exceeds 1,400 entries, and even this is achieved only by grouping some grades together. There are considerable price shifts near the edges of the size bands, so a 0.49 carats (98 mg) stone may list at $5,500 per carat = $2,695, while a 0.50 carats (100 mg) stone of similar quality lists at $7,500 per carat = $3,750. Stones near the top of a size band (or rarer fancy coloured varieties) tend to be uprated slightly. Some of the price jumps are related to marketing and consumer expectations. For example, a buyer expecting a 1 carat (200 mg) diamond solitaire engagement ring may be unwilling to accept a 0.99 carats (198 mg) diamond.

There are numerous diamond grading laboratories, with each offering investors, consumers and dealers similar diamond-grading and verification services, including the Gemological Institute of America (GIA) and the CIBJO (Confédération Internationale de la Bijouterie, Joaillerie et Orfèvrerie), also known as the World Jewellery Confederation. If the standards set by such organisations are called into question, ramifications are felt throughout the diamond industry. In 2005, the GIA was sued by a dealer who had supplied diamonds to the Saudi royal family after the accuracy of GIA-issued certificates was questioned. As a result of a subsequent investigation, four GIA employees were fired for breach of the GIA's ethical codes. The GIA also claims to have changed some of its procedures to prevent such occurrences from happening again.

The non-linear pricing of different sizes (weights) of diamonds means that it is not realistic to exchange, for example, two quarter-carats (50 mg) for one half-carat (100 mg). With commodities such as gold, it is clear that one 20-gram bar is worth the same as two 10-gram bars, assuming the same purity. In most terminal markets, there needs to be a readily available standard quality, or limited number of qualities, available in sufficient quantity to be tradeable. This is a major factor which affects liquidity. The many variables in diamond quality makes commodity-like pricing difficult, especially with rarer stones that merit special handling above standard-issue diamonds.

The investment parameter of diamonds is their high value per unit weight, which makes them easy to store and transport. A high-quality diamond weighing as little as 2 or 3 grams could be worth as much as 100 kilos of gold. This extremely condensed value and portability does bestow diamonds as a form of emergency funding. People and populations displaced by war or extreme upheaval have used this portable asset successfully.

In 2009, an exchange was launched by DODAQ to trade categories of polished diamonds. The DODAQ exchange is intended to be a terminal market for round, polished, certified diamonds (the most liquid part of the market) and hosts its centralised storage facility in a Freezone. The exchange is an attempt to overcome the traditional investment barriers of sales tax and low liquidity on the resale market.

In 2012, DODAQ nv and the Antwerp World Diamond Centre joined forces to create DIAMDAX. It is the first online diamond exchange to report the actual transaction price. The exchange provides its users with a fully automated trading platform and acts as counter party to both buyer and seller, offering anonymity to its users.

Rare "fancy colored diamonds" such as yellows, pinks, blues and greens have proved to be a secure investment over the five years preceding 2012. This is based on the principles of supply and demand as well as new economies entering the market. Rio Tinto has announced that they intend to close the Argyle Mine in Western Australia in 2016–2018 which will impact the dwindling supply.

In its Global Diamond Report 2014, Bain & Co reports that demand for investment diamonds accounts for less than 5% of the total value of polished diamonds. It also reports that diamond prices have benefited from 1.6x lower volatility than gold. Characteristics of investment-grade polished diamonds are highest color (D, E, F) and clarity (IF, VVS1, VVS2), weights ranging from 1 to 10 carats, triple-EX grading (Excellent Cut, Excellent Polish, Excellent Symmetry), and no fluorescence.

=== Polki (unfaceted) diamonds ===
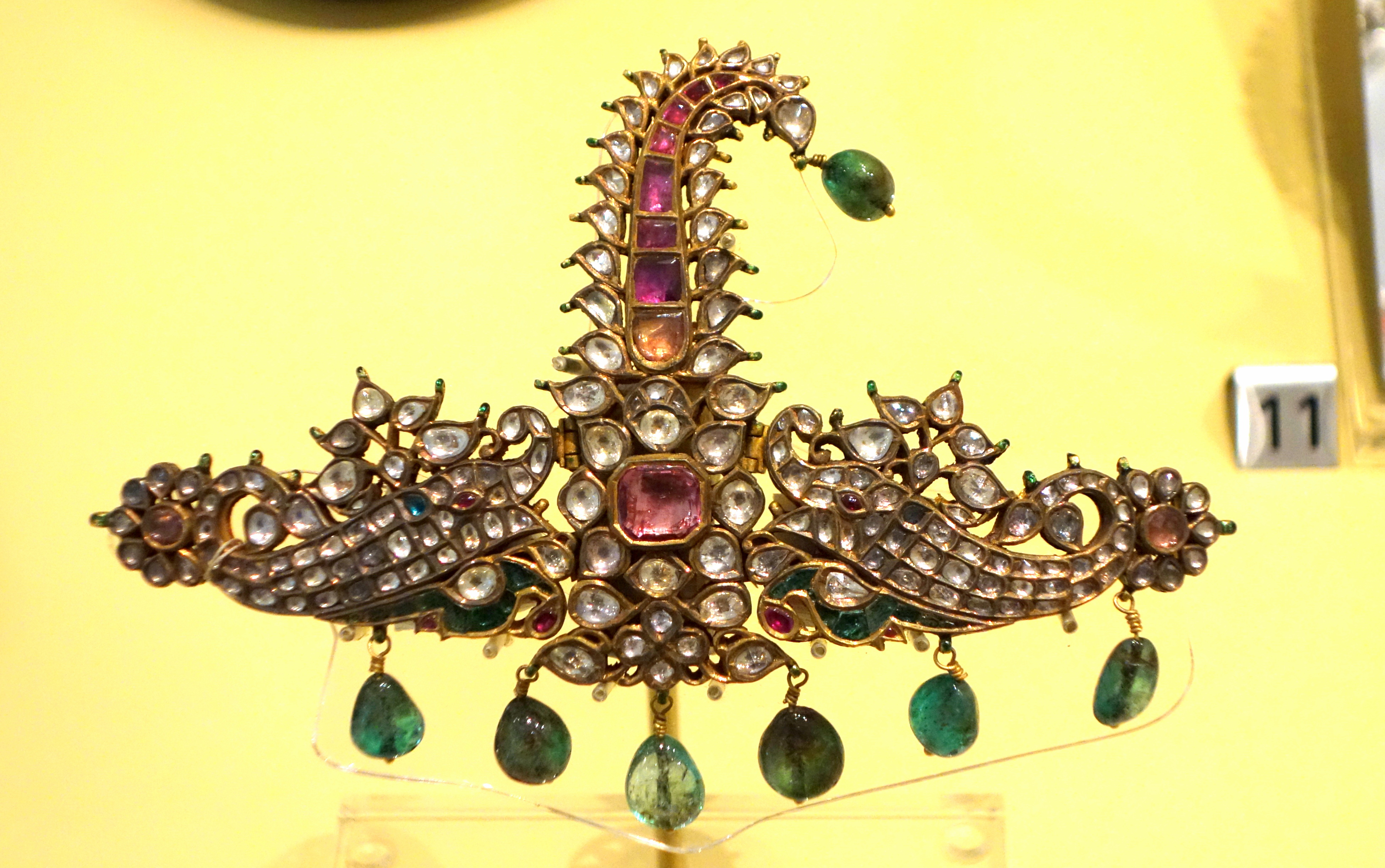
Sarpech (turban ornament), India, possibly Rajasthan, Mughal period, 18th century, gold, unfaceted diamonds, rubies, emeralds, enamel – Royal Ontario Museum

Old diamond jewellery in India, specially from the Mughal period, uses unfaceted diamonds. Mughal style jewellery has become popular in India recently featuring uncut diamonds termed "Polki" (which originally referred to a style of cleaving diamonds). The diamonds used in modern polki jewellery are low grade and do not have much investment value, even though polki jewellery can be expensive. The diamonds are backed by silver foil to allow light to reflect. The Kundan jewellery in India uses the same style, but it uses glass instead of diamonds.

=== Funds ===
In June 2012, Finanz Konzept AG launched the worldwide first actively managed physical diamond fund, which invests in natural physical polished diamonds and coloured diamonds.

In November 2012, PureFunds launched an Exchange Traded Fund listed on the New York Stock Exchange that invests in companies engaged in the diamond industry, rather than invest in physical diamonds. The fund ceased trading on January 23, 2014.

=== Mining companies ===
Mining companies produce and sell rough diamonds. Given the very high expense of operating a diamond mine, many diamond mining companies are public and/or owned by governments.

The largest diamond company in the world is Alrosa, which surpassed De Beers in carat production in 2008. De Beers is privately owned by Anglo American (85%) and the Botswana government (15%), so its shares are not traded on the stock market. The Oppenheimer family had previously owned a 40% stake in De Beers, but this was sold to Anglo American in 2011. Rio Tinto and BHP are the next largest producers, but diamond mining is a small part of their commodity portfolio.

== Recycled diamonds ==
Diamonds, because of their hardness, are one of the few gemstones that have a recycled market. Recycled diamonds are diamonds that have been polished and set into jewelry, then removed and possibly re-cut before sale back into the diamond industry. This sector accounts for 5%–10% of market supply. Many jewelers typically offer to repurchase diamonds at a 15–20% discount relative to their selling price.

Whether it is releasing capital to re-invest in more liquid stock, or generating greater margin on re-purchased diamond jewelry, repurchasing diamonds is part of an ongoing strategy for many members of the jewelry industry. In 2012, Tacy Ltd. stated that it expected $1 billion worth of recycled diamonds to be put back into the market. In 2013, its estimation was $1.2 billion.

=== The market ===
Diamonds of a certain size, generally half a carat and above, are traded and processed by the industry individually. Each has unique attributes and a corresponding unique market place. Diamonds of this size, whether recycled or not, have a similar market price. It is impossible to tell the difference between a recycled one-carat diamond (as long as it is undamaged) and a "freshly mined" one-carat diamond with the same characteristics, and the market does not differentiate between them.

Diamonds of smaller sizes are traded in parcels of similar stones, called 'melee,' after the French word for mix. Generally diamonds of exactly similar size, cut, shape, color and clarity are used in a single piece of diamond jewelry. If not, the stones would not match and the piece would not sell. Small recycled diamonds are treated differently from large individual stones. A single small diamond has limited value by itself. It is only of use if it can be matched with other similar diamonds, reset into jewelry and sold to a customer, thereby creating value. Small recycled diamonds need to be sorted, have their cut modified and resold to manufacturers in large parcels to allow them to pick matching stones to set in jewelry.

== See also ==
- Alternative investment
- Gold as an investment
- Inflation hedge
- List of diamonds
- Palladium as an investment
- Platinum as an investment
- Silver as an investment
