= Moshrageh Rural District =

Rural district in Khuzestan province, Iran

Moshrageh Rural District Persian: دهستان مشراگه
- Rural District
- Location within Iran
- Coordinates: 31°07′55″N 49°22′18″E
- Country: Iran
- Province: Khuzestan
- County: Ramshir
- District: Moshrageh
- Capital: Moshrageh

Population (2016)
  - Total: 7,294
- Time zone: UTC+3:30 (IRST)

Moshrageh Rural District (Persian: دهستان مشراگه) is in Moshrageh District of Ramshir County, Khuzestan province, Iran. It is administered from the city of Moshrageh.

== Demographics ==
=== Population ===
At the time of the 2006 National Census, the rural district's population was 4,991 in 902 households. There were 5,421 inhabitants in 1,358 households at the following census of 2011. The 2016 census measured the population of the rural district as 7,294 in 1,865 households. The most populous of its 36 villages was Abdollah-e Amuri, with 1,164 people.
