= Azadeh Rural District =

Rural district in Khuzestan province, Iran

Azadeh Rural District Persian: دهستان آزاده
- Rural District
- Location within Iran
- Coordinates: 30°55′32″N 49°31′08″E
- Country: Iran
- Province: Khuzestan
- County: Ramshir
- District: Moshrageh
- Capital: Romeyleh-ye Olya

Population (2016)
  - Total: 7,039
- Time zone: UTC+3:30 (IRST)

Azadeh Rural District (Persian: دهستان آزاده) is in Moshrageh District of Ramshir County, Khuzestan province, Iran. Its capital is the village of Romeyleh-ye Olya. The previous capital of the rural district was the village of Moshrageh, now a city.

== Demographics ==
=== Population ===
At the time of the 2006 National Census, the rural district's population was 8,225 in 1,864 households. There were 7,407 inhabitants in 1,757 households at the following census of 2011. The 2016 census measured the population of the rural district as 7,039 in 1,853 households. The most populous of its 40 villages was Paygah-e Panjam Shakari, with 1,674 people.
