= Moshrageh District =

District in Khuzestan province, Iran

Moshrageh District Persian: بخش مشراگه
- District
- Location within Iran
- Coordinates: 31°01′56″N 49°26′36″E
- Country: Iran
- Province: Khuzestan
- County: Ramshir
- Capital: Moshrageh

Population (2016)
  - Total: 16,428
- Time zone: UTC+3:30 (IRST)

Moshrageh District (Persian: بخش مشراگه) is in Ramshir County, Khuzestan province, Iran. Its capital is the city of Moshrageh.

== History ==
After the 2006 National Census, the village of Moshrageh merged with two other villages and was elevated to the status of a city.

== Demographics ==
=== Population ===
At the time of the 2006 census, the district's population was 13,216 in 2,766 households. The following census in 2011 counted 14,621 people in 3,568 households. The 2016 census measured the population of the district as 16,428 inhabitants in 4,282 households.

=== Administrative divisions ===
Moshrageh District Population
Administrative Divisions	2006	2011	2016
Azadeh RD	8,225	7,407	7,039
Moshrageh RD	4,991	5,421	7,294
Moshrageh (city)		1,793	2,095
Total	13,216	14,621	16,428
RD = Rural District
