= Diamond exchange =

The term diamond exchange typically refers to a place where diamonds are exchanged.

Notable instances include:

- Israel Diamond Exchange, the diamond exchange center of Israel
- Diamond Exchange District, a diamond district in the Israeli city of Ramat Gan
- Bharat Diamond Bourse
- London Diamond Bourse
- Dubai Diamond Exchange
- 14 Maiden Lane, or the Diamond Exchange, a New York building formerly used by gem dealers

== Other ==
- The Diamond Exchange, a professional wrestling stable led by wrestler Diamond Dallas Page in the American Wrestling Association

== See also ==
- World Federation of Diamond Bourses
