= World Federation of Diamond Bourses =

International trade organization

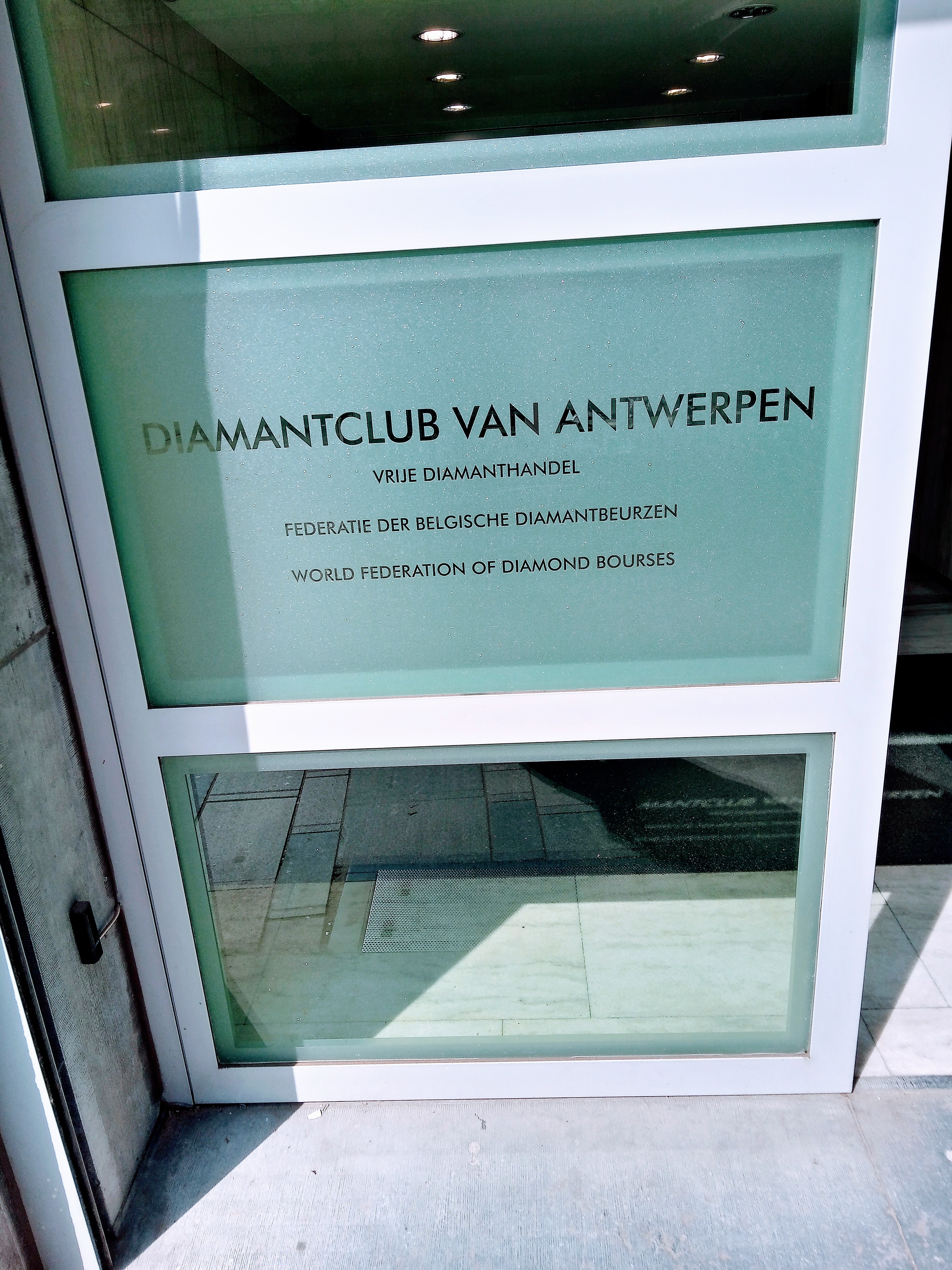
The federation shares office space with two national diamond organisations

The World Federation of Diamond Bourses, founded in 1947, was created to provide bourses trading in rough and polished diamonds and precious stones with a common set of trading practices. It is composed of 27 member diamond bourses. Their headquarters are in Antwerp. Members of The World Federation of Diamond Bourses (WFDB) act as a medium for wholesale diamond exchange, trading both polished and rough diamonds. The WFDB consists of independent diamond bourses in major centers of the diamond trade such as Tel Aviv, Antwerp, Mumbai, Johannesburg, London and New York and other cities across the United States, Europe and Asia. The WFDB provides a legal framework and convenes to enact regulations for its members. The following is a list of the 27 bourses.

- Antwerpsche Diamantkring CVBA (Belgium)
- Bangkok Diamonds and Precious Stones Exchange (Thailand)
- Beurs voor Diamanthandel CVBA (Belgium)
- Bharat Diamond Bourse (India)
- Borsa Diamanti D'Italia (Italy)
- Borsa Istanbul (Turkey)
- Diamant- und Edelsteinbörse E.V. (Germany)
- Diamant- Club Wien (Austria)
- Diamantclub van Antwerpen CVBA (Belgium)
- Diamond Bourse of Canada
- Diamond Bourse of Southeast United States, Inc.
- Diamond Club West Coast, Inc. (United States)
- Diamond Dealers Club of New York (United States) – Based in the Diamond District in Midtown Manhattan, New York
- Diamond Dealers Club of Australia
- Diamond Dealers Club of South Africa
- Diamond Exchange of Singapore
- Dubai Diamond Exchange
- Hong Kong Diamond Bourse Ltd. (People's Republic of China)
- The Israel Diamond Exchange Ltd.
- The Israel Precious Stones and Diamonds Exchange Ltd.
- Korea Diamond Bourse
- The London Diamond Bourse (United Kingdom)
- The New Israel Club for Commerce in Diamonds Ltd.
- Shanghai Diamond Exchange (People's Republic of China)
- Tokyo Diamond Exchange Inc. (Japan)
- Vereniging Beurs voor den Diamanthandel (Netherlands)
- Vrije Diamanthandel NV (Belgium)

Associated member:

- The Gem and Jewellery Export Promotion Council India (GJEPC)
- Hong Kong Indian Diamond Association (HKIDA)

== See also ==
- Diamond Exchange District
- World Diamond Congress
- Diamonds as an investment
