= Bharat Diamond Bourse =

Diamond exchange in Mumbai, India

- Type: Diamond exchange
- Location: Mumbai, India
- Founded: 2010
- Key people: Anoop Mehta (President); Mehul Shah (Vice-President); Reza Kabul (Architect)
- Currency: Indian rupee ₹
- Commodities: Diamonds
- Website: bdbindia.org

Bharat Diamond Bourse (BDB) is the world's largest diamond bourse (exchange) and is located in Mumbai, India. Spread over a 8.1-hectare (20-acre) plot, the complex is home to some 2,500 small and large diamond traders in addition to the Custom House, banks and other service providers who cater to the gems and jewelry trade. The complex contains 26 towers each having nine floors. The total constructed area is 190,000 m^{2} (2,000,000 sq ft), with two basements of additional 93,000 m^{2} (1,000,000 sq ft). The facilities at BDB comprise offices of diamond traders, four walk-in vaults, 24,500 safe deposit boxes, a 580-square-metre (6,200 sq ft) trading floor, strong rooms, lockers and customs clearance facilities with all the modern facilities required to carry on day-to-day business.

It is located in the G Block of the Bandra Kurla Complex, between the Mumbai suburbs of Bandra and Kurla. It has an inflow of some 45,000–50,000 people daily. BDB handles 98% of diamond exports from India. However, competition arose due to the inauguration of the SDB in Surat.

== History ==
In 1984, the project was started by a group of Mumbai-based diamond traders. Mumbai Metropolitan Region Development Authority gave 8.1 hectares (20 acres) on an 80 years lease. The project initially involved the public sector Minerals and Metals Trading Corporation. It withdrew from the project later and BDB took it over from there. Then it was restarted in 1992. But disputes between the BDB committee, its architects and contractors and payment defaults by members during the 1995–99 property slump put the project on hold in 1998. It was restarted in 2001. The construction cost of an estimated ₹11 billion (US$110 million) was collected from members.

== India's diamond industry ==
India's diamond industry, which is estimated to grow by an average 10 to 15 percent each year in the next five years, accounts for 70–75 percent of total diamond exports in the world and employs 850,000 people, making it the largest cutting hub by value and number of employees. Last year, the country's import of rough diamonds rose 24.5 percent to 149.8 million carats against a year earlier, and export of cut and polished diamonds witnessed a surge of 28.3 percent to 59.9 million carats. The old market is located at Opera House and Prasad Chambers (Charni Road).

The cutting and polishing of diamonds occurs mainly in the city of Surat, which is also known as 'Diamond City'. The cutting and polishing units in Surat vary from large firms employing several thousands of diamond cutting and polishing workers to very small informal enterprises having a few workers. The larger Cutting and Polishing of Diamonds (CPD) units have relatively better work and employment conditions and even provide for elaborate benefits. Most of the CPD units are owned by Kathiawadis, who were originally farmers from Northern Gujarat region. The whole diamond cutting and polishing industry is largely community oriented, where most of the owners and workers are Kathiawadis. In the recession of 2008, while many of the small and medium-sized CPD units were closed down with lay-off of workers, there were still some big CPD enterprises who managed to retain their workforce. This was primarily because of the paternal approach of owners, by which they consider workers as extended family members

== See also ==
- Surat Diamond Bourse
- London Diamond Bourse
