= Reza Kabul =

Indian architect and urban planner

- Born: Mumbai, India
- Occupation: Architect
- Practice: Reza Kabul Architects Pvt. Ltd.
- Website: www.architectrezakabul.com

Reza Kabul is an architect, interior designer and Urban planner.

== Early life and education ==
Kabul grew up living above his father's Irani café in Mumbai. He and his brothers worked there after school and even managed it when their father was away. He attained his Bachelor of Architecture (BArch) from the Maharaja Sayajirao University of Baroda in 1985.

== Career ==
Reza Kabul established Reza Kabul Architects Pvt. Ltd. in 1988. In 2011, the studio marked its milestone of 25 years in the industry with the launch of Archlights, a The Times of India (Times Property) initiative that profiled and highlighted his contribution to architecture and real estate development. The four-paged edition featured Kabul's projects, alongside testimonials from the construction industry members. The firm has now grown into an international practice with offices in Mumbai, Pune and San Francisco.

== Awards ==
- 2004 : Accommodation Times for The Best Architect of the Year
- 2015 : The Johnson - Society Honours Award for Creative Excellence
