= World Diamond Congress =

The World Diamond Congress is a bi-annual industry event organized by the World Federation of Diamond Bourses and the International Diamond Manufacturers Association. The first World Diamond Congress was held in Antwerpen, Belgium in 1947. It was held annually until 1956 and every other year since. Between meeting years, the World Federation of Diamond Bourses and the International Diamond Manufacturers Association hold their Presidents' Meeting. The 41st Congress will take place in July 2026 in Singapore.

Previous Congresses:

- 1947 1st World Diamond Congress Antwerp, Belgium
- 1948 2nd World Diamond Congress Antwerp, Belgium
- 1949 3rd World Diamond Congress London, United Kingdom
- 1950 4th World Diamond Congress Amsterdam, Netherlands
- 1951 5th World Diamond Congress Antwerp, Belgium
- 1953 6th World Diamond Congress London, United Kingdom
- 1954 7th World Diamond Congress Antwerp, Belgium
- 1955 8th World Diamond Congress Paris, France
- 1956 9th World Diamond Congress Tel Aviv, Israel
- 1958 10th World Diamond Congress Antwerp, Belgium
- 1960 11th World Diamond Congress Johannesburg, South Africa
- 1962 12th World Diamond Congress Vienna, Austria
- 1964 13th World Diamond Congress New York, USA
- 1966 14th World Diamond Congress Milan, Italy
- 1968 15th World Diamond Congress Tel Aviv, Israel
- 1970 16th World Diamond Congress Johannesburg, South Africa
- 1972 17th World Diamond Congress Antwerp, Belgium
- 1975 18th World Diamond Congress Amsterdam, Netherlands
- 1978 19th World Diamond Congress Ramat Gan, Israel
- 1980 20th World Diamond Congress Johannesburg, South Africa
- 1982 21st World Diamond Congress New York, USA
- 1984 22nd World Diamond Congress Antwerp, Belgium
- 1986 23rd World Diamond Congress Tel Aviv, Israel
- 1988 24th World Diamond Congress Singapore
- 1991 25th World Diamond Congress London, United Kingdom
- 1993 26th World Diamond Congress Antwerp, Belgium
- 1996 27th World Diamond Congress Tel Aviv, Israel
- 1998 28th World Diamond Congress Bangkok, Thailand
- 2000 29th World Diamond Congress Antwerp, Belgium
- 2002 30th World Diamond Congress London, United Kingdom
- 2004 31st World Diamond Congress New York, USA
- 2006 32nd World Diamond Congress Tel Aviv, Israel
- 2008 33rd World Diamond Congress Shanghai, China
- 2010 34th World Diamond Congress Moscow, Russia
- 2012 35th World Diamond Congress Mumbai, India
- 2014 36th World Diamond Congress Antwerp, Belgium
- 2016 37th World Diamond Congress Dubai, United Arab Emirates

== See also ==
- Diamonds as an investment
- List of diamonds
