= London Diamond Bourse =

Diamond exchange based in London

Coordinates: 51°31′8.26″N 0°6′29.52″W

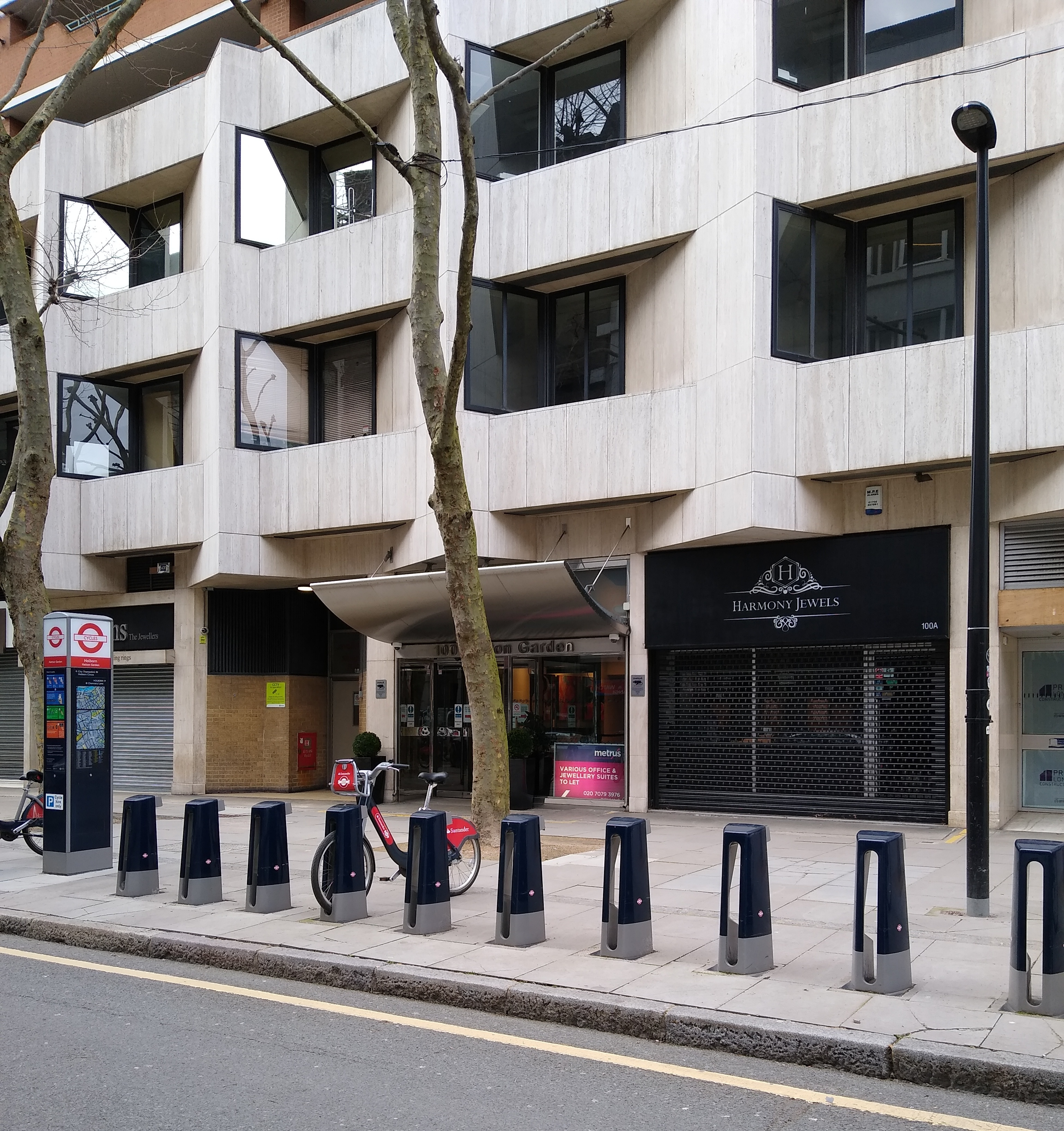
London Diamond Bourse

The London Diamond Bourse is a diamond exchange based in London's Hatton Garden area. As of 2016, it had been trading for 76 years, and with rising property costs in the Hatton Garden area, the bourse was considering a move out of the center of London to a new location in the suburbs.

== See also ==
- Bharat Diamond Bourse
- Antwerp Diamond District
