= Israel Beck =

Belgian businessman

Israel Beck Knight of the Order of Leopold II
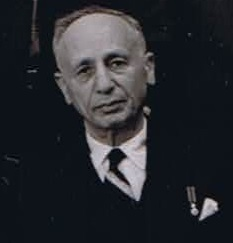
- Born: 1891; Sanok, Galicia (southern Poland)
- Died: 1972 (aged 80–81); Antwerp, Belgium
- Resting place: Putte, Netherlands
- Occupation: Diamond trader
- Years active: 1907-1972
- Employer: Beck Diamonds
- Organization: Antwerpsche Diamantkring
- Title: President of the Board
- Term: 1961-1972
- Predecessor: Frans Beukelaar
- Successor: Michel Fraenkel
- Board member of: Antwerpsche Diamantkring
- Spouse: Helena Beck-Blitz
- Children: Isaac Beck; Edith Beck; Leopold Beck
- Parents: Dayan (Rabbinical Judge) Kalman Wolf Beck; Ethel Beck
- Relatives: Axel Beck (grandson); Raoul Beck (grandson)
- Website: beck-diamonds.com

Israel Beck (1891–1972) was a founding member of the Antwerpsche Diamantkring, the world's largest and first-ever diamond bourse to be dedicated to rough diamonds trade. He was President of the Board from 1961 until his death in 1972. By that time, he had served benevolently 43 years as a member of the Board, promoting diamond trade internationally and the Antwerp diamond industry in particular, and representing the Antwerpsche Diamantkring at the World Diamond Congress.

== Early life ==
Beck was born in 1891 in Sanok, southern Poland (a region which was known as Galicia). He married Helena Blitz, with whom he had three children (Isaac, Edith, and Leopold). In 1907 he joined his future father in law, Louis (Levie) Blitz, to become the third generation of family members in the diamond trade.

== Between World War I and World War II ==
Beck co-founded the Antwerpsche Diamantkring, and became in 1929 a member of its first Board of Directors immediately upon its establishment as the first diamond bourse worldwide for rough diamond trade. By 1932 he opened a new diamond factory with his brother, in the center of the diamond district in Antwerp.

== During World War II ==
Beck and his family fled Belgium during World War II, crossing France and finding shelter during the final years of the war as refugees in Geneva, Switzerland.

== After World War II ==
The diamond industry in Antwerp had to recover from the many human losses that were suffered during the Second World War. After the war, Beck returned to Antwerp and benevolently dedicated much of his time and attention to the rebuilding of Antwerp's diamond trade and the industry. In 1957 he became Vice-president of the Board of the Antwerpsche Diamantkring, and in 1961 he was elected President of the Board.

== Memberships to other Boards of directors ==
- Vice-president of the World Federation of Diamond Bourses
- National Board member at the Syndicate of the Belgian Diamond Industry
- Board member of the Diamantexpo
- Board member of the Diamond Office

== Honors and awards ==
- Knight of the Order of Leopold II, appointed by his Majesty King Baudouin of Belgium on January 4, 1955, in recognition of the services rendered to the Kingdom of Belgium and in particular for the development of the diamonds trade in Antwerp.
- Honorary distinction granted on 19 November 1968 by the Diamantexpo for his contributions to the industry as Board member

== Subsequent family members to enter the diamond business ==
Israel Beck's two sons Isaac and Leopold Beck joined the family business, becoming the fourth generation of diamond traders. Leopold Beck has been heading Beck Diamonds in Antwerp since 1972. Leopold Beck's two sons became the fifth generation of diamond traders in the family: Axel Beck joined Beck Diamonds in 1995, whereas Raoul Beck joined in 1997 and heads DiamAlps in Switzerland, and Hauthentic Jewellery in Switzerland.
