= Belgium Penal Transaction Law =

Belgian legal procedure

The Penal Transaction Law (French: transaction pénale; Dutch: minnelijke schikking in strafzaken) is a Belgian law that allows a court to end a public prosecution in exchange for the payment of a sum of money. The law is often enacted to expedite trials where a successful prosecution is in doubt, or in cases that are likely going to be lengthy and protracted, or are at risk of being delayed. The settlement does not equal a conviction, and does not appear on the criminal record of those under investigation. Under article 2046 of the Civil Code, the right to propose a settlement rests exclusively with the Public Prosecutor at any time during the proceedings.

== History ==
=== Early versions 1930s – 1980s ===
The origins of Belgium's penal settlement law date to 1935, when Belgian Parliament moved to create a new prosecutorial mechanism in order to expedite the processing of court cases and reduce backlog. The application of the mechanism was gradually broadened over the years, being originally reserved for small offences only.

On 28 June 1984, the law underwent its most recent significant amendment when article 216bis was added. The article introduced the Criminal Transaction and made the law applicable to any criminal offence carrying a maximum prison sentence of five years.

=== Major amendments 2011 – 2017 ===
Amending the law was first discussed in 2008, based on an initiative by the Antwerp World Diamond Centre, a private organization representing the business interests of the diamond industry. The proposal was rejected by lawmakers at the time.

The debate resurfaced in 2011, when Minister for Institutional Reforms and deputy chairman of the parliamentary diamond forum, Servais Verherstraeten, proposed "to amend the Code of Criminal Procedure with regard to the discontinuance of criminal proceedings by paying a sum of money." Subsequently, the transaction law was significantly reformed on 14 April 2011, with amendments to article 216bis in particular carrying procedural and material implications. Previously, a proposal for a penal transaction could not be brought forward by the prosecutor if criminal proceedings had already been initiated. Therefore, a penal transaction was only possible while proceedings were still in the preliminary investigation stage. Since the amendment, however, a criminal transaction can now be proposed by the public prosecutor even when the case has already been referred to a judge to order an in-depth investigation or when the court has already made itself apprised of the case at hand.

In July 2011, article 216bis was amended to once again further extend the law's application to more financial crimes and misdemeanors, such as tax matters. The amendment was regarded as a way to fight back the judicial backlog, particularly in cases pertaining to financial matters, and as a means to return large sums of money to the state that would otherwise have been lost.

In 2017, a Commission of Inquiry was assembled to investigate how the law had come about. It was determined that the law passed due to a political give-and-take between the PS and Liberal Party at the time, with the PS seeking to push through a lift on banking secrecy, while the liberals sought for a new criminal settlement arrangement. A political agreement was reached on 3 February 2011 following the mediation of the Yves Leterme (CD&V) cabinet. On 4 July 2017, the head of the inquiry commission, Dirk van der Maelen (SP.A), stated his belief in an interview with Belgian newspaper Knack that the diamond sector and College of Prosecutors-General are the "fathers" of the settlement law, under the political responsibility of the CD&V. He justified this point of view by arguing that the law was drafted by two lawyers on behalf of the Antwerp World Diamond Center in 2007, in order to help the industry deal with fiscal fraud accusations.

It has been suggested that a similar transaction law adopted in France in January 2017 could serve as an inspiration for Belgian lawmakers, because it features a "public interest compensation agreement" which places greater emphasis on being "reformative" for the purpose of criminal prevention via a mandatory compliance program.

== Criticism ==
Critics argue that the amendment marked the first step towards "class justice" and a two-speed court system favoring those who are able to afford such payments.

Belgium's constitutional court ruled in June 2016 that parts of the law were unconstitutional as the termination of the prosecution following a settlement payment occurs without effective control by a judge. The court argued this constitutes a violation of the principles of equality and non-discrimination enshrined in the Constitution.

The law was annulled as a consequence. However, because some lower courts continued to pronounce verdicts which the constitutional court still accepted as being within the limits it had laid down in its ruling, the College of Prosecutors-General decided to reinstate the law in June 2017.

== See also ==
- Belgian Code of Criminal Procedure
