= Armenians in Belgium =

Հայերը Բելգիայում
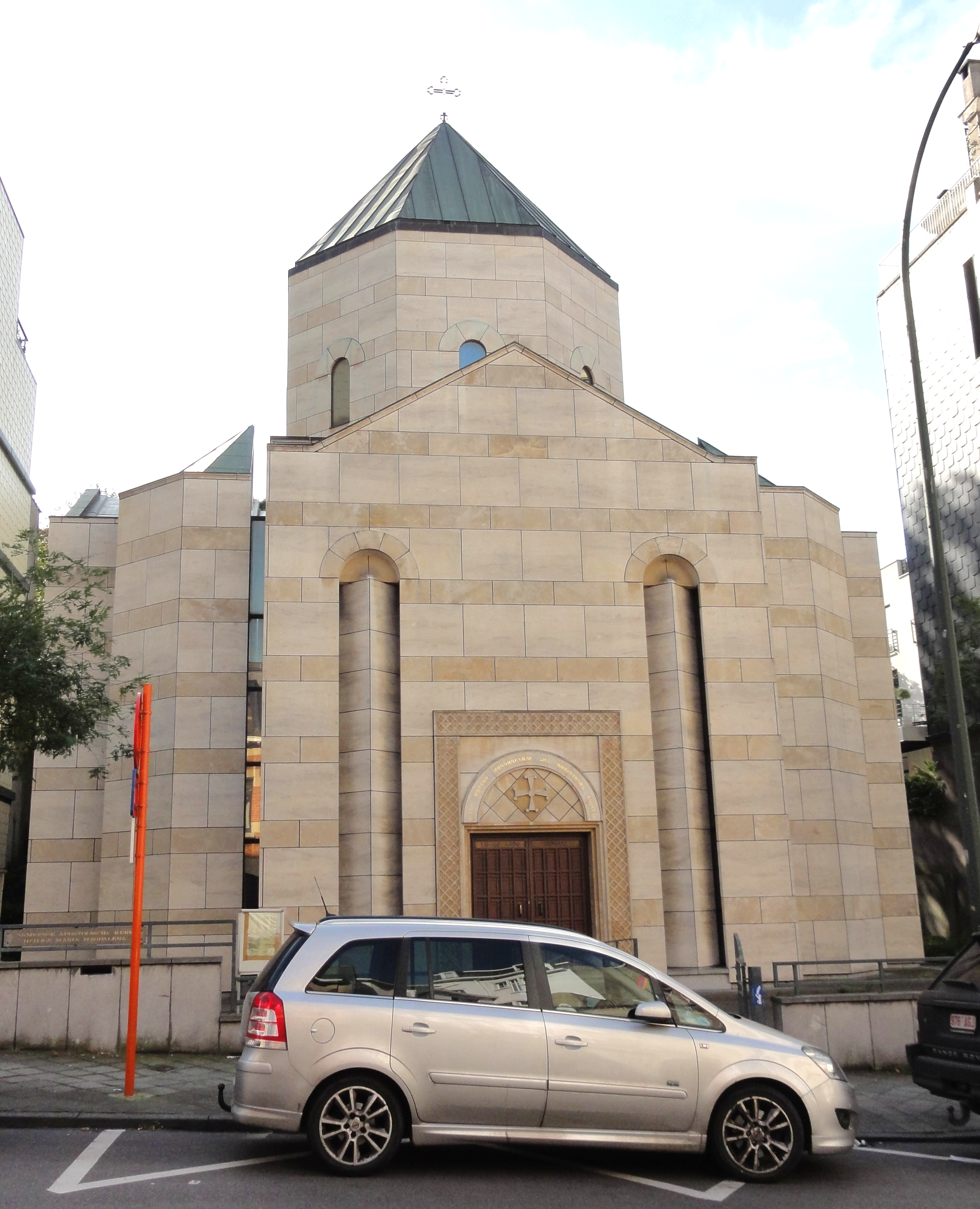
- ِArmenian church in Ixelles, Belgium

Total population
- 40,000

Regions with significant populations
- Brussels; Antwerp; Mechelen

Languages
- Armenian • Dutch • French • German; Smaller numbers also speak Russian

Religion
- Christianity (Armenian Apostolic Church • Armenian Catholic Church • Armenian Evangelical Church)

Armenians in Belgium are citizens of Belgium of Armenian ancestry. The exact number of Armenians in the country is unknown, but is unofficially estimated to be about 40,000.

One of the important sectors that Armenian communities in Belgium excel and are involved in is the diamonds trade business, which is based primarily in the diamond district. Some of the famous Armenian families involved in the diamond business in the city are the Artinians, Arslanians, Aslanians, Barsamians and the Osganians.

== History ==
The earliest records of what is known as Belgium today go as far back as the 4th century, when Armenian priests, merchants and intellectuals dropped anchor in Belgian ports including a certain Saint Servais, an Armenian bishop who visited town of Tongres, east of Brussels. Belgian hagiographers such as Macaire mention Armenian preachers in Ghent in the year 1011.

But the meaningful Armenian presence started with Armenian merchants appearing starting first half of the 15th century mainly related to the trade of carpets in Bruges. By 1478 Armenians had established a hospice. Also in Bruges, Armenian merchants also started importing cotton goods, spices, perfumes and other materials from the Orient and exporting European goods to markets in the East. Their presence continued well into the 16th century.

While the Armenian presence in Belgium was not broken throughout the centuries, the size of the community did not start growing considerably until the end of the First World War and the forced mass exodus of Armenians from Turkey following the 1915 Armenian genocide.

Armenians were known for their trades in carpets and rugs, tobacco and jewelry. In the tobacco sector, original Armenian brands like Davros, Arax, Marouf and Enfi were the only cigarette brands made in Belgium. Behind each of these names were Armenian families, mostly immigrants from Turkey, who had settled in Belgium at the turn of the 20th century. The Missirian, Tchamkertian, Matossian and the Enfiadjian families held a monopoly over the tobacco industry in the country. As more refugees poured into Belgium from Turkey after 1915, these families became the major employers.

Another sector the Armenians of Belgium excelled in was trade of diamonds. A member of the Barsamian family was the President of the prestigious Diamond Club of Belgium in 1920 at a time when Tcherkezian, Ipekjian and Hampartsoumian families were top names in the business. Following in their footsteps are businesses by the Artinian, Oskanian and Arslanian families along with around 50 smaller dealers, experts and traders who have continued heir "substantial niche" in Antwerp’s One Square Mile Diamond District.

In the early 20th century, there was a "small Armenian merchant and professional community" in Belgium that was "concentrated in Antwerp". In February 1920, Tigran Chamkerten (a tobacco importer and president of the Committee of Belgian Armenians (French: Comité Arménien de Belgique)) was appointed by the Armenian government the consul of Armenia to Belgium. On 27 August 1920, Belgium granted Armenia de jure recognition, following the signing of the Treaty of Sèvres.

== Contemporary period ==
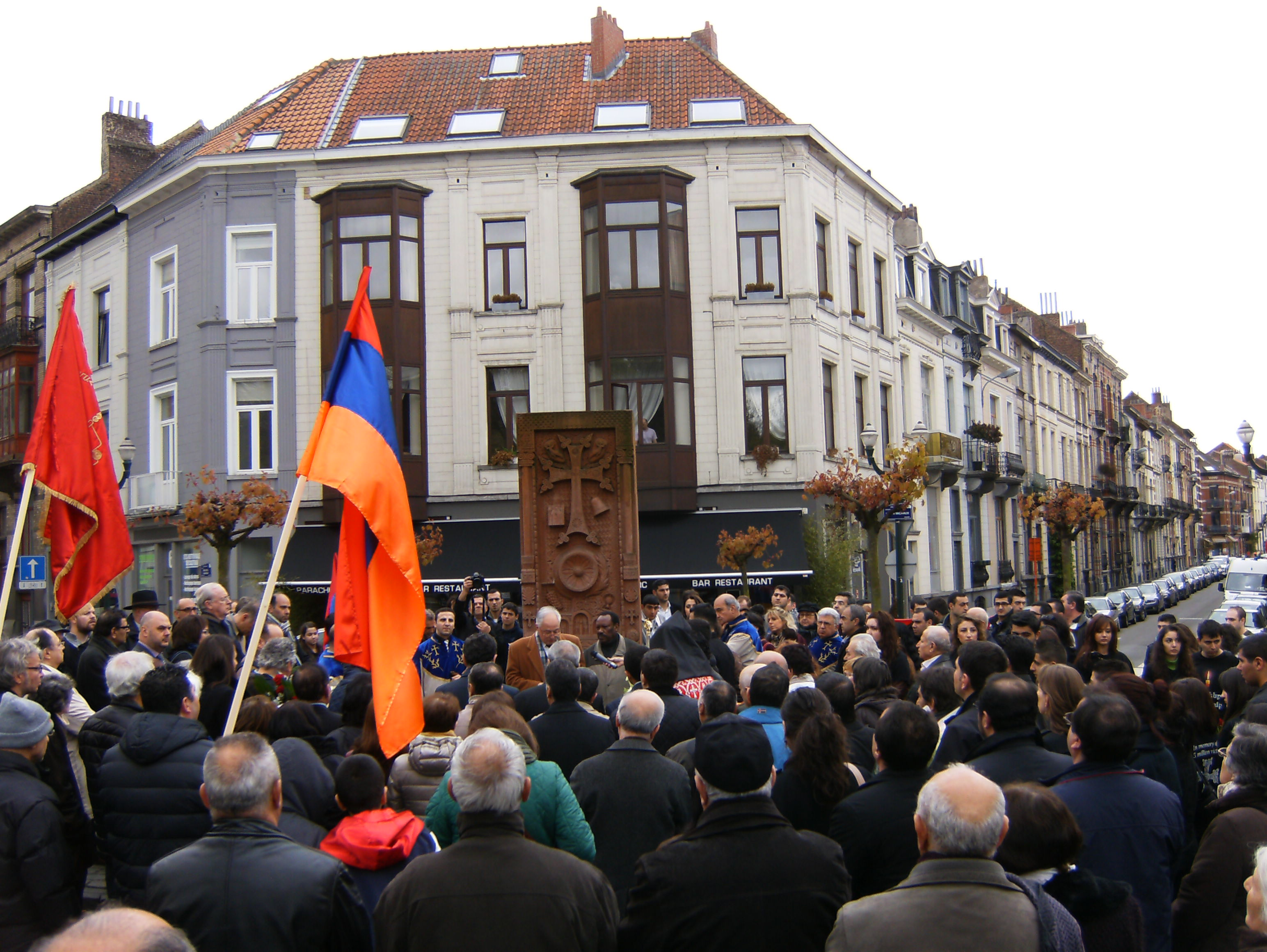
2012 Brussels commemoration in front of the Memorial for the Armenian genocide.

Today, the Committee of Belgian Armenians that started in the late 1920s is very active. It is also officially recognized by the Belgian government, and tries to represent about 40,000 Armenians living in the country. They include the first generation refugees from Turkey, large groups that came from Iran in 1970, from Lebanon and Syria and recently from Armenia. A 1,500-strong contingent repatriated from two Kurdish villages in eastern Turkey.

An Armenian church, "Eglise Armenienne Apostolique Sainte Marie-Madeleine" is the main church of the Armenian Apostolic Orthodox community. It is related to the Mother See of Holy Etchmiadzin of Armenian Apostolic Church. The church structure was erected and consecrated in May 1990 through the generosity of benefactors Mr. and Mrs. Khachig and Madeline Khatchigov. There is also a smaller Armenian Catholic community belonging to the Armenian Catholic Church and some Armenian Evangelicals.

There is also the Armenian "Centre sociale" for community gatherings was established in the early 1980s and has played an indispensable role in organizing public life for the Armenians.

== Armenian-Belgian relations ==
Armenian-Belgian relations have been quite friendly since Armenia's independence in 1991, especially in trade. Armenia currently has an embassy in Brussels as well as missions to the European Union and NATO. Belgium is also one of the countries to have recognized the Armenian genocide which continues to be denied by Turkey.

On 23 April 2015, the Flemish Parliament of Belgium unanimously adopted a resolution to fully recognize the Armenian genocide. The motion was put forward by all political parties of Flanders. The motion further called on Turkey to recognize the massacres as a genocide. In 1997, an Armenian khachkar was erected in the square Henri Michaux, Brussels to commemorate the victims of the Armenian genocide.

== See also ==
- Armenia–Belgium relations
- Armenian diaspora
- Armenians in France
- Armenians in Germany
- Armenians in the Netherlands
- List of Armenians
- Mission of Armenia to the European Union
- Villa Empain, owned by the Jean Boghossian foundation
