= Antwerp diamond district =

Area within the city of Antwerp, Belgium

Coordinates: 51.214509°N 4.4182508°E

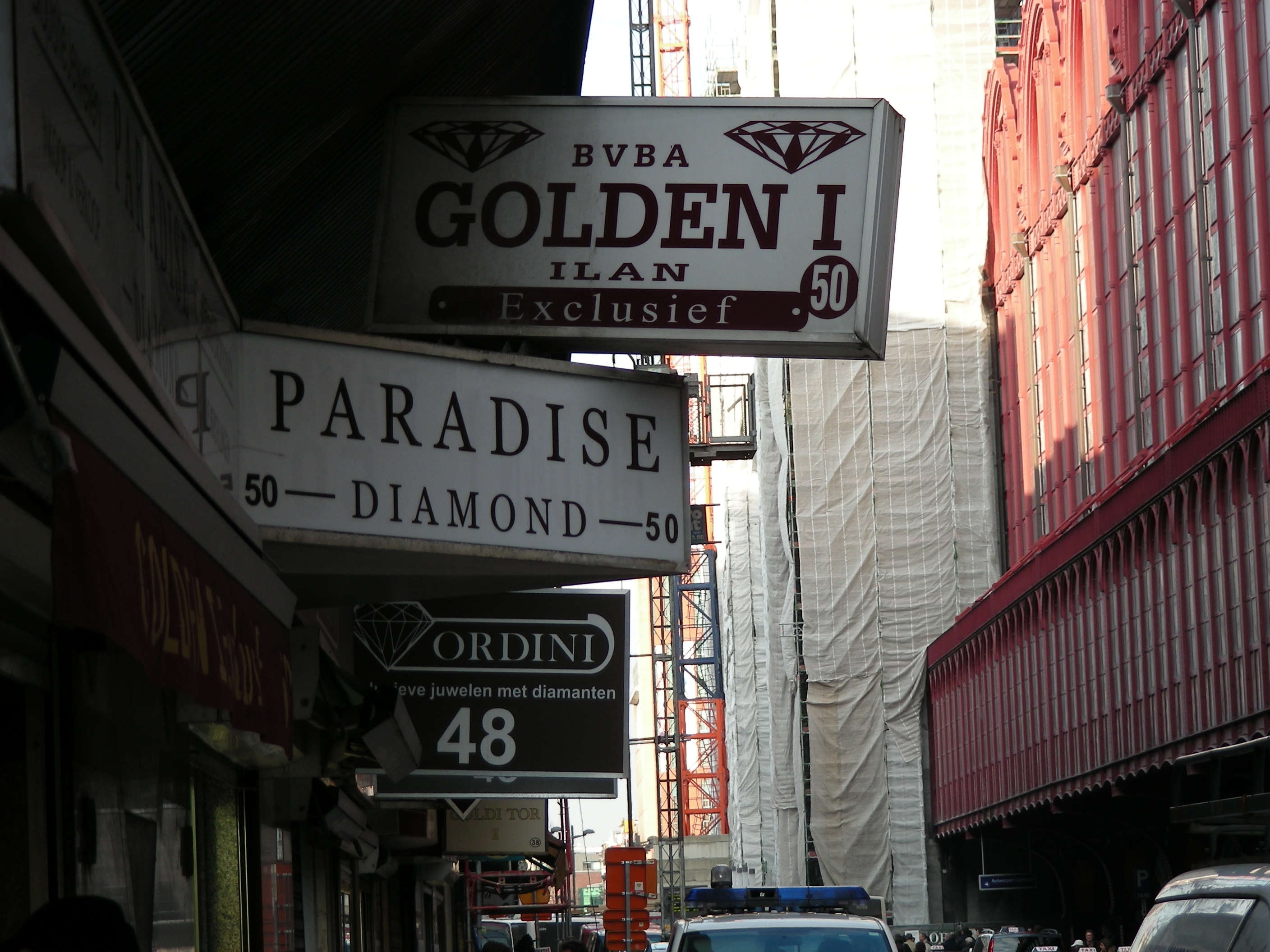
Diamond shops

Antwerp's diamond district, also known as the Diamond Quarter (Diamantkwartier), and dubbed the Square Mile, is an area within the city of Antwerp, Belgium. It consists of several square blocks covering an area of about one square mile. While as of 2012, much of the gem cutting and polishing work historically done in the neighborhood had moved to low wage centers elsewhere, about 84% of the world's rough diamonds passed through the district, making it the largest diamond district. In 2011, it had a turnover of $56 billion dollars. Each year, approximately 50% of the rough diamonds return to Antwerp for cutting and polishing such as The Black Falcon, the world's largest cut diamond.

Over $16 billion in polished diamonds pass through the district's exchanges each year. There are 380 workshops that serve 1,500 companies. There are also 3,500 brokers, merchants and diamond cutters. In 2017, roughly 234 million carats were traded in the district, an area with a workforce of 30,000 people. Over 80% of rough diamonds were purchased in Antwerp.

Within the area is the Antwerp World Diamond Centre, and four trading exchanges including the Diamond Club of Antwerp and the Beurs voor Diamanthandel, both of which were founded by Hasidic diamantaires, the Antwerpsche Diamantkring and the Vrije Diamanthandel.

The neighborhood is dominated by Jewish, Jain Indians, Lebanese Maronite Christian, and Armenian dealers, known as diamantaires. More than 80% of Antwerp's Jewish population works in the diamond trade; Yiddish was, historically, a main language of the diamond exchange. No business is conducted on Saturdays.

== Location ==
The diamond district is located adjacent to the Central Station (Antwerp Centraal) and a few minutes' walk to Meir, Antwerp's main shopping street. The Antwerp Zoo is also nearby. There are numerous and various restaurants, bars and cafes around the district.

== History ==
Antwerp has been a focus of the diamond trade since the 15th century. The industry was transformed when Lodewyk van Berken invented a new form of diamond polishing tool, the scaif, which enabled the creation of the stereotypical sparkling, multifaceted diamond. This attracted orders from European nobility - and attracted other craftsmen to Antwerp. Charles the Bold commissioned him to cut and polish the Florentine Diamond. In the 1890s a diamond industry was established in Antwerp by families of diamonds traders and manufacturers who came from Amsterdam, Netherlands.

After the Second World War, the city's mayor encouraged Jews to return to Antwerp and many did so, including some who were working in the diamond trade. That helped to boost the industry. There was a subsequent decline however, starting in the 1960s, when some of the polishing business moved to India because of lower labour costs. Subsequently, some of the cutting business also moved to that country. A 2019 research study stated that India continued to dominate the cutting and polishing industry.

In February 2003, thieves stole loose diamonds, gold, silver and other types of jewelry valued at more than $100 million in the Antwerp diamond heist, also known as the "heist of the century."

The industry has avoided the 2022 European sanctions against Russia although the imports from Alrosa have diminished. If banned, the Antwerp World Diamond Centre claims 10,000 jobs would be at risk.

== See also ==
- Antwerp Diamond Bank
- Antwerp Diamond Heist
- Diamond District
- Diamond Exchange District - Israel
- Jewelers' Row, Philadelphia
- Hatton Garden, London
- Kimberley Process Certification Scheme
- The Black Falcon
