= Armenia–Netherlands relations =

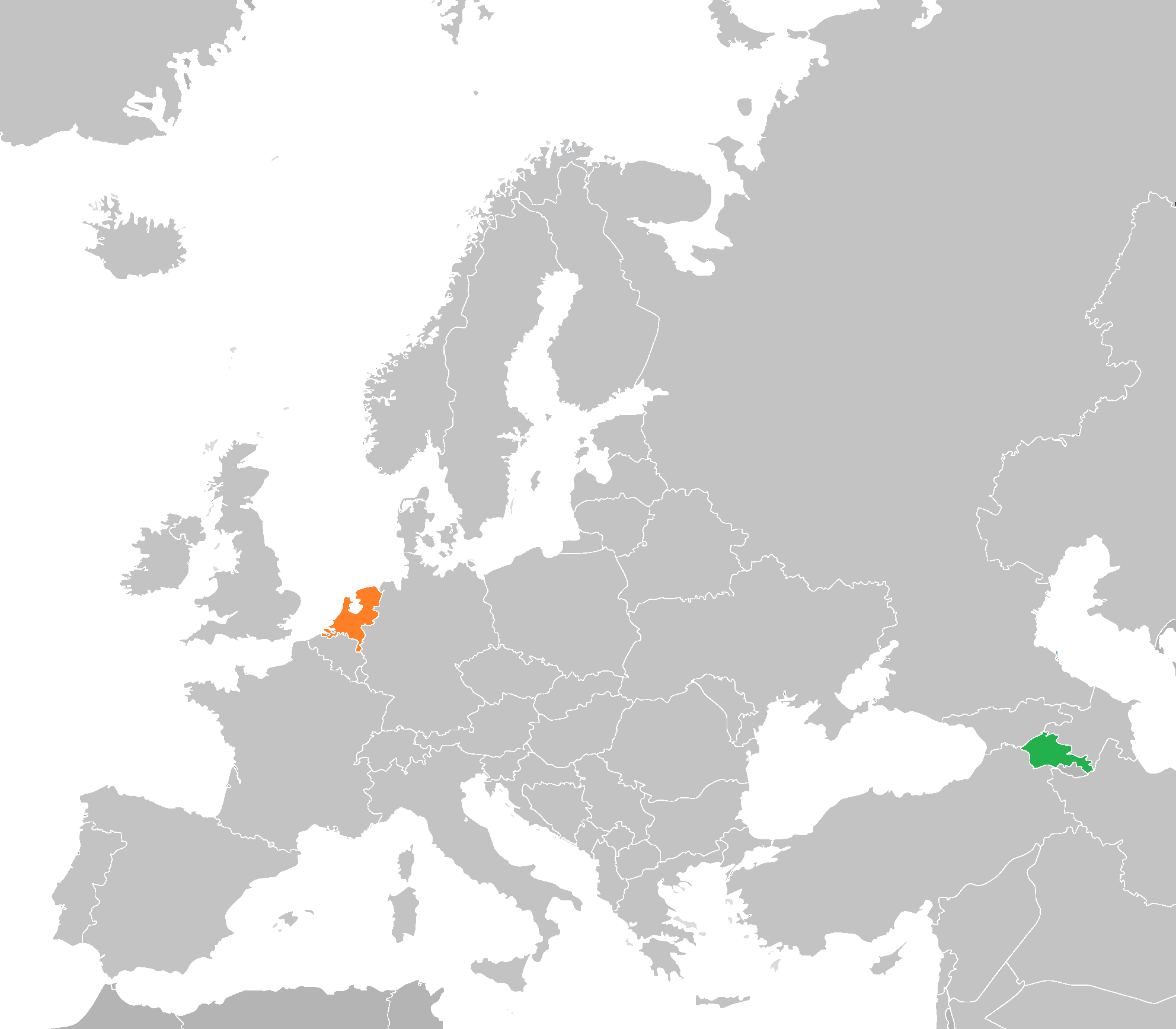

- Armenia: Netherlands

Diplomatic mission
- Embassy of Armenia, The Hague: Embassy of the Netherlands, Yerevan

Envoy
- Ambassador Tigran Balayan: Ambassador Nico Schermers

Armenia–Netherlands relations are foreign relations between Armenia and Netherlands. Diplomatic relations between both countries were established in January 30, 1992. Armenia is represented in the Netherlands through its embassy in The Hague and 2 honorary consulates (in Amsterdam and in Hilversum). The Netherlands has an embassy in Yerevan. There are around 6,000 people of living in the Netherlands. Both countries are members of the Council of Europe.

== History ==
Armenia and the Netherlands have a long history of foreign relations. Despite this, the Netherlands does not have an embassy in Yerevan.

Armenian citizens can apply for a short-term Schengen visa for the Netherlands (maximum 90 days within a six-month period) at the Dutch Embassy in Georgia or the German Embassy in Armenia .

On 26 November 2013, Ambassador Extraordinary and Plenipotentiary of the Kingdom of the Netherlands to Armenia Hans Horbach (residence in Tbilisi ) presented his credentials to the President of Armenia Serzh Sargsyan. On 7 July, 2000, Robert Hans Zick (residence in Hilversum) was appointed Honorary Consul of Armenia in Amsterdam.

On 8 February 2011, Dzyunik Aghajanyan was appointed Ambassador Extraordinary and Plenipotentiary of the Republic of Armenia to the Kingdom of the Netherlands.

== Armenian genocide recognition ==
The Netherlands recognized the Armenian genocide in 2004. On February 22, 2018, the Dutch House of Representatives unanimously adopted the bill recognizing the Armenian genocide.

== Diplomacy ==
Republic of Armenia

- The Hague (Embassy)

of the Netherlands

- Yerevan (Embassy)

== See also ==
- Foreign relations of Armenia
- Foreign relations of the Netherlands
- Armenia-NATO relations
- Armenia-EU relations
  - Accession of Armenia to the EU
- Armenians in the Netherlands
- Armenians in Europe
- Dutchs in Armenia
- Recognition of the Armenian genocide
