= Armenians =

Ethnic group indigenous to the Armenian Highlands of West Asia.

Հայեր (Armenian) Hayer (Romanized)
- Map of the Armenian diaspora around the world

Total population
- c. 8 million to 11 million

Regions with significant populations
- Armenia 2,961,514
- Russia: 1,182,388–2,900,000
- United States: 1,000,366–1,500,000
- Turkey: 60,000; 300,000–5,000,000 (Hidden Armenians)
- France: 250,000–750,000
- Georgia: 168,191
- ∟ Abkhazia: 41,907
- Lebanon: 150,000
- Iran: 120,000
- Ukraine (Note: The number of Ukrainian Armenians is estimated to be far lower due to the Russian invasion of Ukraine, as these are pre-war figures.): 100,000 (2001)
- Brazil: 100,000
- Germany: 90,000–110,000
- Greece: 80,000
- Argentina: 70,000
- Canada: 68,855
- Uzbekistan: 50,000–70,000
- Poland: 40,000–80,000
- Belgium: 40,000
- Spain: 40,000
- Bulgaria: 30,000
- Syria (Note: The number of Syrian Armenians is difficult to estimate due to the Syrian Civil War. Many fled to Lebanon, Armenia, and the West respectively.): 25,000–30,000
- Kazakhstan: 25,000
- Australia: 22,526
- United Kingdom: 18,000–20,000
- Uruguay: 15,000–20,000
- United Arab Emirates: 10,000 (2022)
- Iraq: 10,000 (2011)
- Netherlands: 5,689–8,374 (2021)
- Israel and Palestine: 2,000–10,000
- Romania: 1,361–10,000 (2011)
- Cyprus: c. 4,000

Languages
- Armenian · Armenian Sign

Religion
- Mostly Christianity (97.5%) (Apostolic · Catholic · Evangelical · Orthodox); Minorities: Irreligious (1%) · Armenian paganism (1.5%)(neopaganism)
- n: by legal nationality m: by nationality, naturalisation and descendant background

Armenians (Armenian: հայեր, romanized: hayer, [hɑˈjɛɾ]) are an ethnic group indigenous to the Armenian highlands of West Asia. Armenians constitute the main demographic group in Armenia and constituted the main population of the breakaway Republic of Artsakh until their subsequent expulsion after the 2023 Azerbaijani offensive. There is a large diaspora of around five million people of Armenian ancestry living outside of Armenia. The largest Armenian populations exist in Russia, the United States, France, Georgia, Iran, Germany, Ukraine, Lebanon, Brazil, Argentina, Syria, and Turkey. The present-day Armenian diaspora was formed mainly as a result of the Armenian genocide with the exceptions of Iran, former Soviet states, and parts of the Levant.

Armenian has two mutually intelligible spoken and written forms: Eastern Armenian, today spoken mainly in Armenia, Artsakh, Iran, and the former Soviet republics; and Western Armenian, used in the historical Western Armenia and, after the Armenian genocide, primarily in the Armenian diasporan communities. The unique Armenian alphabet was invented in 405 AD by Mesrop Mashtots.

Most Armenians adhere to the Armenian Apostolic Church, a non-Chalcedonian Christian church within Oriental Orthodoxy. The Armenian Apostolic Church is also the world's oldest national church. Christianity began to spread in Armenia soon after Jesus' death, due to the efforts of two of his apostles, St. Thaddeus and St. Bartholomew. In the early 4th century, the Kingdom of Armenia became the first state to adopt Christianity as a state religion, followed by the first pilgrimages to the Holy Land where a community established the Armenian Quarter of Old Jerusalem.

== Etymology ==
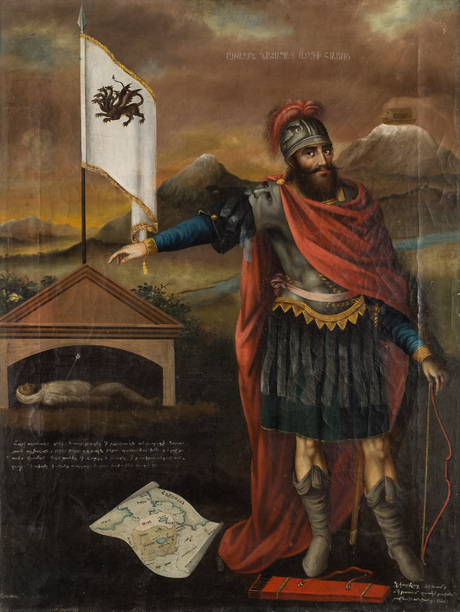
Hayk, the legendary founder of the Armenian nation. Painting by Mkrtum Hovnatanian (1779–1846)

The earliest attestations of the exonym Armenia date around the 6th century BC. In his trilingual Behistun Inscription dated to 517 BC, Darius I the Great of Persia refers to Urashtu (in Babylonian) as Armina (Old Persian: 𐎠𐎼𐎷𐎡𐎴) and Harminuya (in Elamite). In Greek, Armenios (Αρμένιοι) is attested from about the same time, perhaps the earliest reference being a fragment attributed to Hecataeus of Miletus (476 BC). Xenophon, a Greek general serving in some of the Persian expeditions, describes many aspects of Armenian village life and hospitality in around 401 BC.

Some have linked the name Armenia with the Early Bronze Age state of Armani (Armanum, Armi) or the Late Bronze Age state of Arme (Shupria). Armini, Urartian for "inhabitant of Arme" or "Armean country", referring to the region of Shupria, to the immediate west of Lake Van. The Arme tribe of Urartian texts may have been the Urumu, who in the 12th century BC attempted to invade Assyria from the north with their allies the Mushki and the Kaskians. The Urumu apparently settled in the vicinity of Sason, lending their name to the regions of Arme and the nearby lands of Urme and Inner Urumu. The location of the older site of Armani is a matter of debate. Some modern researchers have placed it in the same general area as Arme, near modern Samsat, and have suggested it was populated, at least partially, by an early Indo-European-speaking people. The relationship between Armani and the later Arme-Shupria, if any, is undetermined. Additionally, their connections to Armenians is inconclusive as it is not known what languages were spoken in these regions.

It has also been speculated that the land of Ermenen (located in or near Minni), mentioned by the Egyptian pharaoh Thutmose III in 1446 BCE, could be a reference to Armenia.

Armenians call themselves Hay (Armenian: հայ, pronounced [ˈhaj]; plural: հայեր, [haˈjɛɾ]). The name has traditionally been said to be derived from Hayk (Armenian: Հայկ), the legendary patriarch of the Armenians and a great-great-grandson of Noah, who, according to Movses Khorenatsi (Moses of Khorene), defeated the Babylonian king Bel in 2492 BC and established his nation in the Ararat region. It is also further postulated that the name Hay comes from, or is related to, one of the two confederated, Hittite vassal states—Hayasa-Azzi (1600–1200 BC). Ultimately, Hay may derive from the Proto Indo-European words póti (meaning "lord" or "master") or *h₂éyos/*áyos (meaning "metal").

Khorenatsi wrote that the word Armenian originated from the name Armenak or Aram (the descendant of Hayk). Khorenatsi refers to both Armenia and Armenians as Hayk' (Armenian: Հայք) (not to be confused with the aforementioned patriarch, Hayk).

== History ==
=== Origin ===
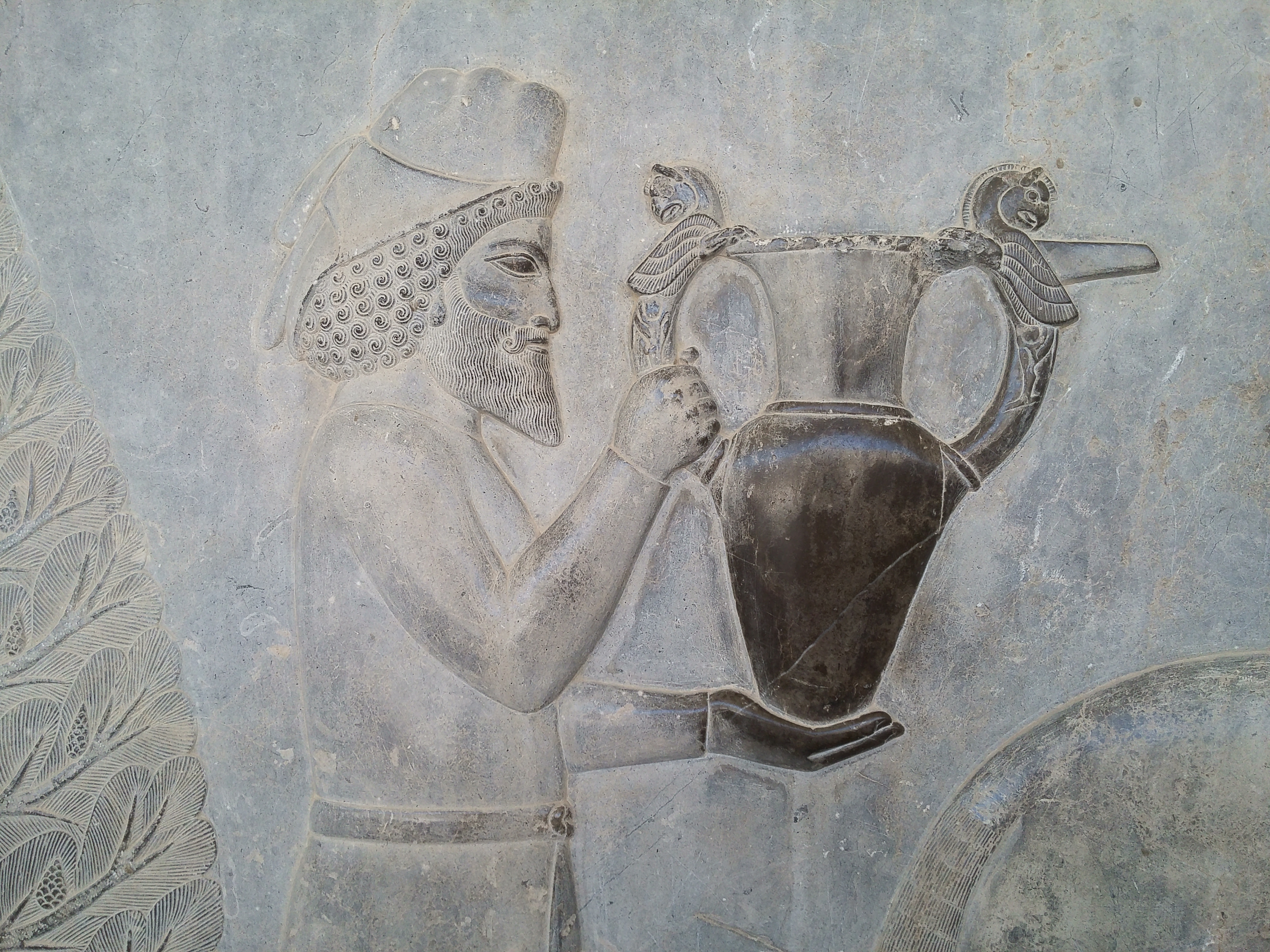
An Armenian tribute bearer carrying a metal vessel with griffin handles. Persepolis, 5th century BC.

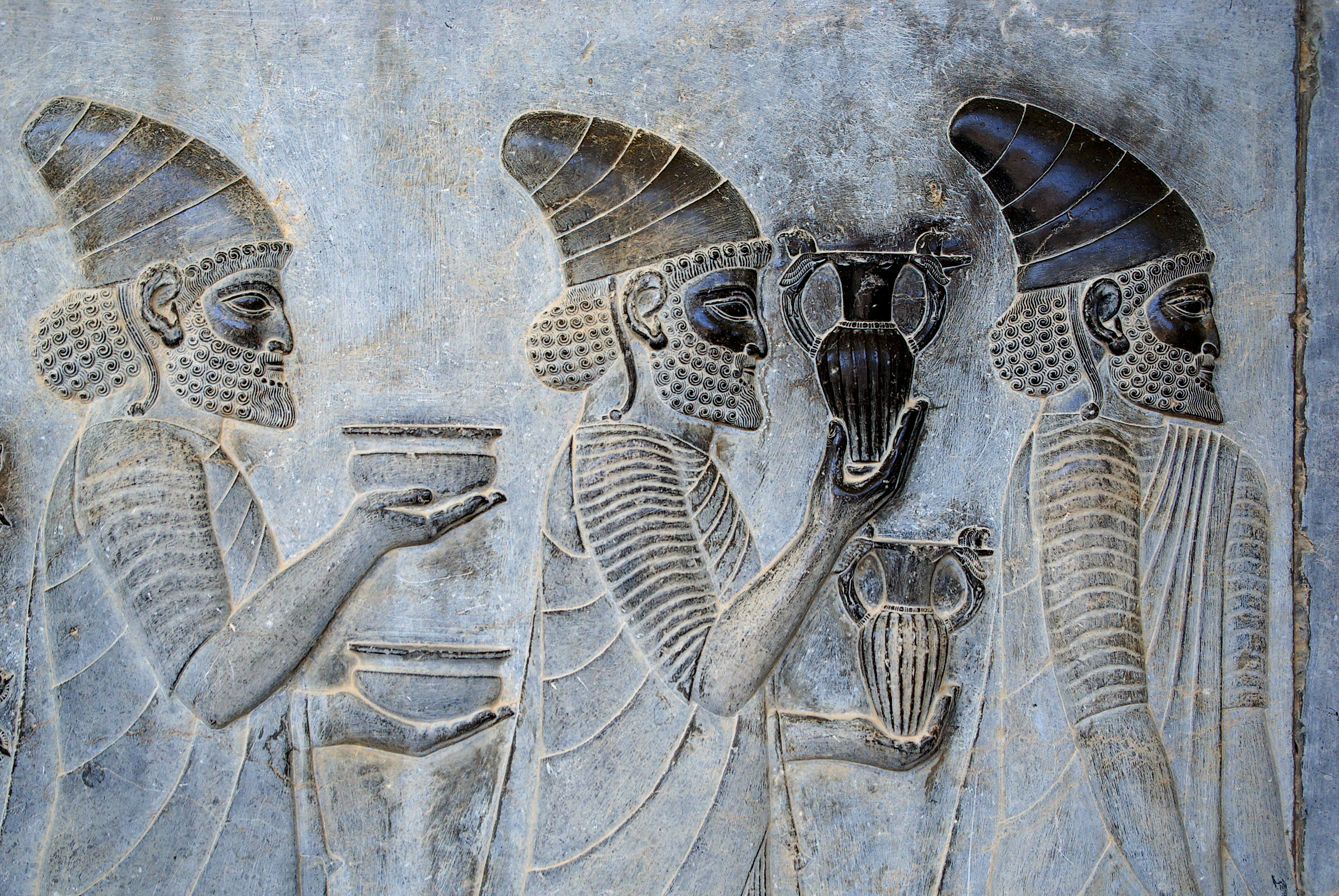
A bas-relief at the Apadana in Persepolis, depicting Armenians bringing their famous wine to the Shah.

While the Armenian language is classified as an Indo-European language, its placement within the broader Indo-European language family is a matter of debate. Until fairly recently, scholars believed Armenian to be most closely related to Greek and Ancient Macedonian. Eric P. Hamp placed Armenian in the "Pontic Indo-European" (also called Graeco-Armenian or Helleno-Armenian) subgroup of Indo-European languages in his 2012 Indo-European family tree. There are two possible explanations, not mutually exclusive, for a common origin of the Armenian and Greek languages.

- In Hamp's view, the homeland of the proposed Graeco-Armenian subgroup is the northeast coast of the Black Sea and its hinterlands. He assumes that they migrated from there southeast through the Caucasus with the Armenians remaining after Batumi while the pre-Greeks proceeded westward along the southern coast of the Black Sea.
- Ancient Greek historian Herodotus (writing c. 440 BCE), suggested that Armenians migrated from Phrygia, a region that encompassed much of western and central Anatolia during the Iron Age: "the Armenians were equipped like Phrygians, being Phrygian colonists" (7.73) (Ἀρμένιοι δὲ κατά περ Φρύγες ἐσεσάχατο, ἐόντες Φρυγῶν ἄποικοι.). This statement was interpreted by later scholars as meaning that Armenians spoke a language derived from Phrygian, a poorly attested Indo-European language. However, this theory has been discredited. Ancient Greek writers believed that the Phrygians had originated in the Balkans, in an area adjoining Macedonia, from where they had emigrated to Anatolia during the Bronze Age collapse. This led later scholars to theorize that Armenians also originated in the Balkans. However, an Armenian origin in the Balkans, although once widely accepted, has been facing increased scrutiny in recent years due to discrepancies in the timeline and lack of genetic and archeological evidence. The view that Armenians are native to the South Caucasus is supported by ancient Armenian historical accounts and legends, which place the Ararat Plain as the cradle of Armenian culture, as well as modern genetic research. In fact, some scholars have suggested that the Phrygians or the apparently related Mushki people were originally from Armenia and moved westward.

Some linguists tentatively conclude that Armenian, Greek (and Phrygian) and Indo-Iranian were dialectally close to each other; within this hypothetical dialect group, Proto-Armenian was situated between Proto-Greek (centum subgroup) and Proto-Indo-Iranian (satem subgroup). This has led some scholars to propose a hypothetical Graeco-Armenian-Aryan clade within the Indo-European language family from which the Armenian, Greek, Indo-Iranian, and possibly Phrygian languages all descend. According to Kim (2018), however, there is insufficient evidence for a cladistic connection between Armenian and Greek, and common features between these two languages can be explained as a result of contact. Contact is also the most likely explanation for morphological features shared by Armenian with Indo-Iranian and Balto-Slavic languages.

It has been suggested that the Bronze Age Trialeti-Vanadzor culture and sites such as the burial complexes at Verin and Nerkin Naver are indicative of an Indo-European presence in Armenia by the end of the 3rd millennium BCE. The controversial Armenian hypothesis, put forward by some scholars, such as Thomas Gamkrelidze and Vyacheslav V. Ivanov, proposes that the Indo-European homeland was around the Armenian Highland. This theory was partially confirmed by the research of geneticist David Reich (et al. 2018), among others. Similarly Grolle (et al. 2018) supports not only a homeland for Armenians on the Armenian highlands, but also that the Armenian highlands are the homeland for the "pre-proto-Indo-Europeans". A large genetic study in 2022 showed that many Armenians are "direct patrilineal descendants of the Yamnaya".

Genetic studies explain Armenian diversity by several mixtures of Eurasian populations that occurred between 3000 and 2000 BCE. But genetic signals of population mixture cease after 1200 BCE when Bronze Age civilizations in the Eastern Mediterranean world suddenly and violently collapsed. Armenians have since remained isolated and genetic structure within the population developed ~500 years ago when Armenia was divided between the Ottomans and the Safavid Empire in Iran. A genetic study (Wang et al. 2018) supports the indigenous origin for Armenians in a region south of the Caucasus which he calls "Greater Caucasus".

In the Bronze Age, several states flourished in the area of Greater Armenia, including the Hittite Empire (at the height of its power in the 14th century BCE), (Mitanni (South-Western historical Armenia, 1500–1300 BCE), and Hayasa-Azzi (1500–1200 BCE). Soon after Hayasa-Azzi came Arme-Shupria (1300s–1190 BCE), the Nairi Confederation (1200–900 BCE), and the Kingdom of Urartu (860–590 BCE), who successively established their sovereignty over the Armenian Highland. Each of the aforementioned nations and tribes participated in the ethnogenesis of the Armenian people. Under Ashurbanipal (669–627 BCE), the Assyrian empire reached the Caucasus Mountains (modern Armenia, Georgia and Azerbaijan).

Luwianologist John D. Hawkins proposed that "Hai" people were possibly mentioned in the 10th century BCE Hieroglyphic Luwian inscriptions from Carchemish. A.E. Redgate later clarified that these "Hai" people may have been Armenians.

=== Antiquity ===
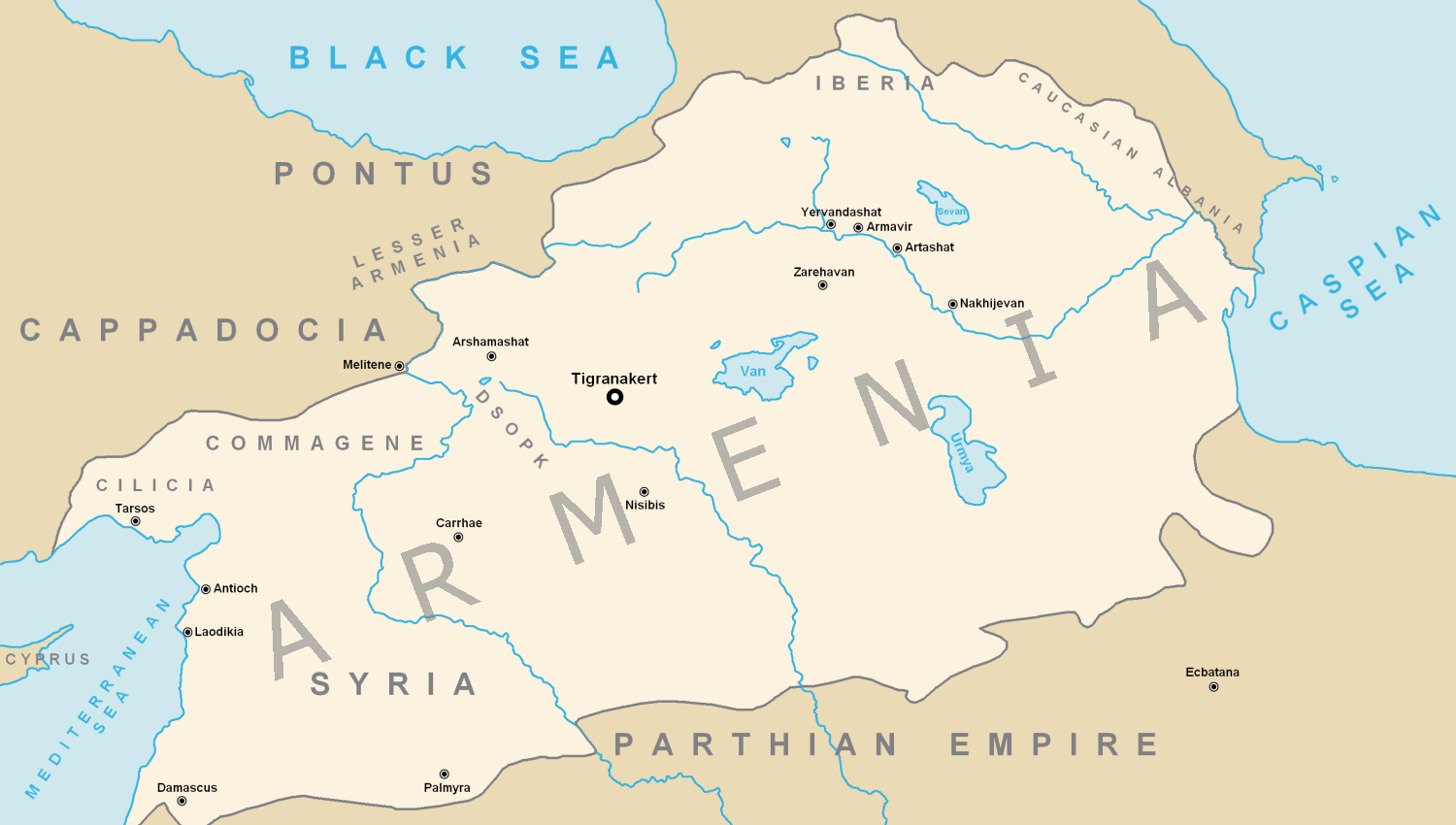
The Kingdom of Armenia at its greatest extent under Tigranes the Great (95–55 BCE)

The first geographical entity that was called Armenia by neighboring peoples (such as by Hecataeus of Miletus and on the Achaemenid Behistun Inscription) was the Satrapy of Armenia, established in the late 6th century BCE under the Orontid (Yervanduni) dynasty within the Achaemenid Persian Empire. The Orontids later ruled the independent Kingdom of Armenia. At its zenith (95–65 BCE), under the imperial reign of Tigran the Great, a member of the Artaxiad (Artashesian) dynasty, the Kingdom of Armenia extended from the Caucasus all the way to what is now central Turkey, Lebanon, and northern Iran.

The Arsacid Kingdom of Armenia, itself a branch of the Arsacid dynasty of Parthia, was the first state to adopt Christianity as its religion (it had formerly been adherent to Armenian paganism, which was influenced by Zoroastrianism, while later on adopting a few elements regarding identification of its pantheon with Greco-Roman deities). In the early years of the 4th century, likely 301 CE, partly in defiance of the Sassanids it seems. In the late Parthian period, Armenia was a predominantly Zoroastrian-adhering land, but by the Christianisation, previously predominant Zoroastrianism and paganism in Armenia gradually declined. This is the period that an Armenian community was established in Judea (modern-day Palestine-Israel), leading to the Armenian Quarter of Jerusalem. Later on, to further strengthen Armenian national identity, Mesrop Mashtots invented the Armenian alphabet, in 405 CE. This event ushered the Golden Age of Armenia, during which many foreign books and manuscripts were translated to Armenian by Mesrop's pupils. Armenia lost its sovereignty again in 428 CE to the rivaling Byzantine and Sassanid Persian empires, until the Muslim conquest of Persia overran also the regions in which Armenians lived.

=== Middle Ages ===
Leo II and Queen Guerane. Armenian manuscript of Queen Keran gospel, 1272

In 885 CE the Armenians reestablished themselves as a sovereign kingdom under the leadership of Ashot I of the Bagratid Dynasty. A considerable portion of the Armenian nobility and peasantry fled the Byzantine occupation of Bagratid Armenia in 1045, and the subsequent invasion of the region by Seljuk Turks in 1064. They settled in large numbers in Cilicia, an Anatolian region where Armenians were already established as a minority since Roman times. In 1080, they founded an independent Armenian Principality then Kingdom of Cilicia, which became the focus of Armenian nationalism. The Armenians developed close social, cultural, military, and religious ties with nearby Crusader States, but eventually succumbed to Mamluk invasions. In the next few centuries, Djenghis Khan, Timurids, and the tribal Turkic federations of the Ak Koyunlu and the Kara Koyunlu ruled over the Armenians.

=== Early modern history ===
Armenians from Yerevan in 1882.

From the early 16th century, both Western Armenia and Eastern Armenia fell under Iranian Safavid rule. Owing to the century long Turco-Iranian geo-political rivalry that would last in Western Asia, significant parts of the region were frequently fought over between the two rivalling empires. From the mid 16th century with the Peace of Amasya, and decisively from the first half of the 17th century with the Treaty of Zuhab until the first half of the 19th century, Eastern Armenia was ruled by the successive Iranian Safavid, Afsharid and Qajar empires, while Western Armenia remained under Ottoman rule. In the late 1820s, the parts of historic Armenia under Iranian control centering on Yerevan and Lake Sevan (all of Eastern Armenia) were incorporated into the Russian Empire following Iran's forced ceding of the territories after its loss in the Russo-Persian War (1826-1828) and the outcoming Treaty of Turkmenchay. Western Armenia however, remained in Ottoman hands.

=== Modern history ===
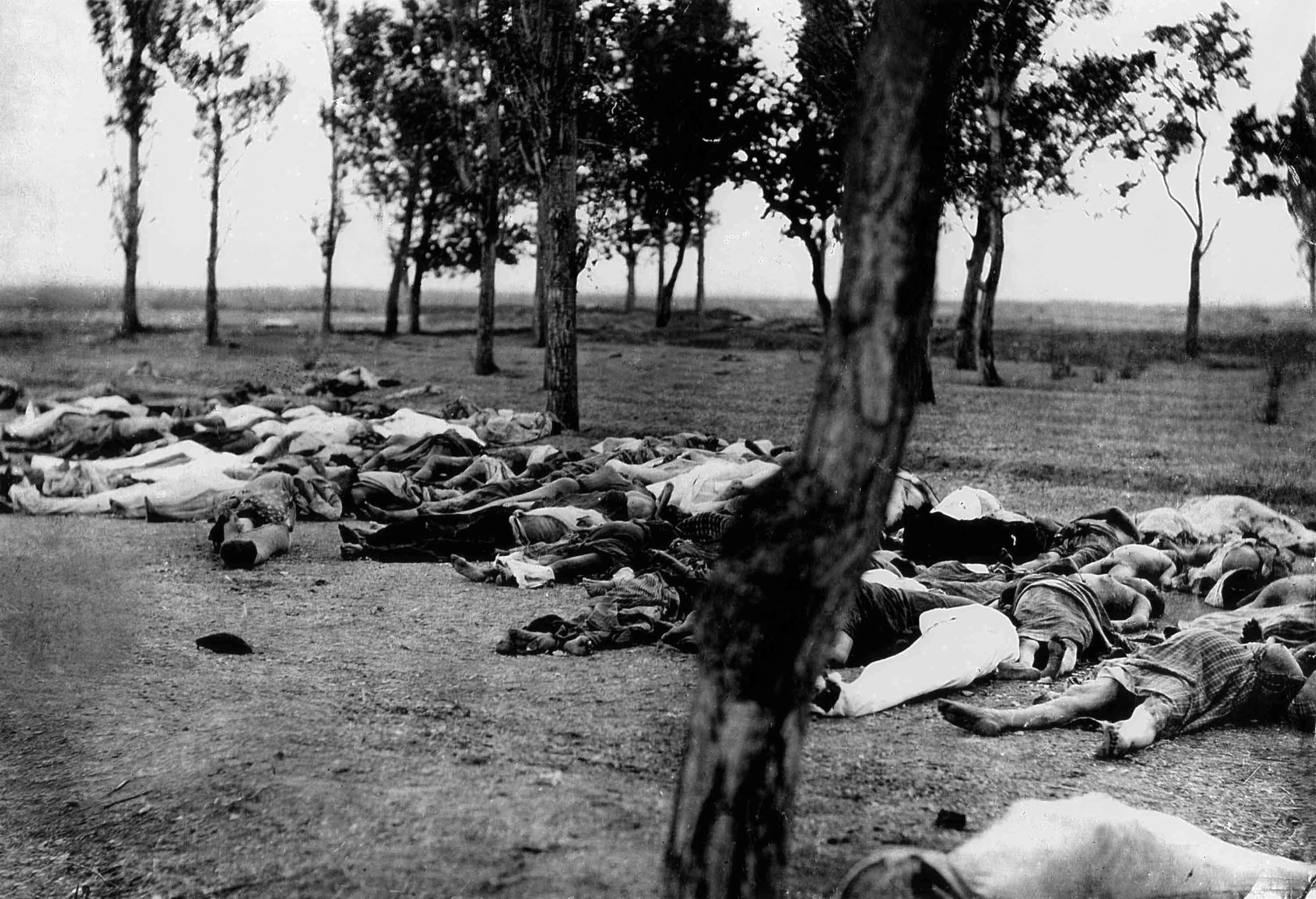
About 1.5 million Armenians were killed during the Armenian genocide in 1915–1918.

The ethnic cleansing of Armenians during the final years of the Ottoman Empire is widely considered a genocide, resulting in an estimated 1.2 million victims. The first wave of persecution was in the years 1894 to 1896, the second one culminating in the events of the Armenian genocide in 1915 and 1916. With World War I in progress, the Ottoman Empire accused the (Christian) Armenians as liable to ally with Imperial Russia, and used it as a pretext to deal with the entire Armenian population as an enemy within their empire.

Governments of the Republic of Turkey since that time have consistently rejected charges of genocide, typically arguing either that those Armenians who died were simply in the way of a war, or that killings of Armenians were justified by their individual or collective support for the enemies of the Ottoman Empire. Passage of legislation in various foreign countries, condemning the persecution of the Armenians as genocide, has often provoked diplomatic conflict. (See recognition of the Armenian genocide)

Following the breakup of the Russian Empire in the aftermath of World War I for a brief period, from 1918 to 1920, Armenia was an independent republic plagued by socio-economic crises such as large-scale Muslim uprisings. In late 1920, the communists came to power following an invasion of Armenia by the Red Army; in 1922, Armenia became part of the Transcaucasian SFSR of the Soviet Union, later on forming the Armenian Soviet Socialist Republic (1936 to 21 September 1991). In 1991, Armenia regained its independence from the USSR. Also in 1991, the ethnic Armenian-majority Nagorno-Karabakh Republic (later the Republic of Artsakh), declared independence from Azerbaijan which lasted until 2023.

== Geographic distribution ==
=== Armenia ===
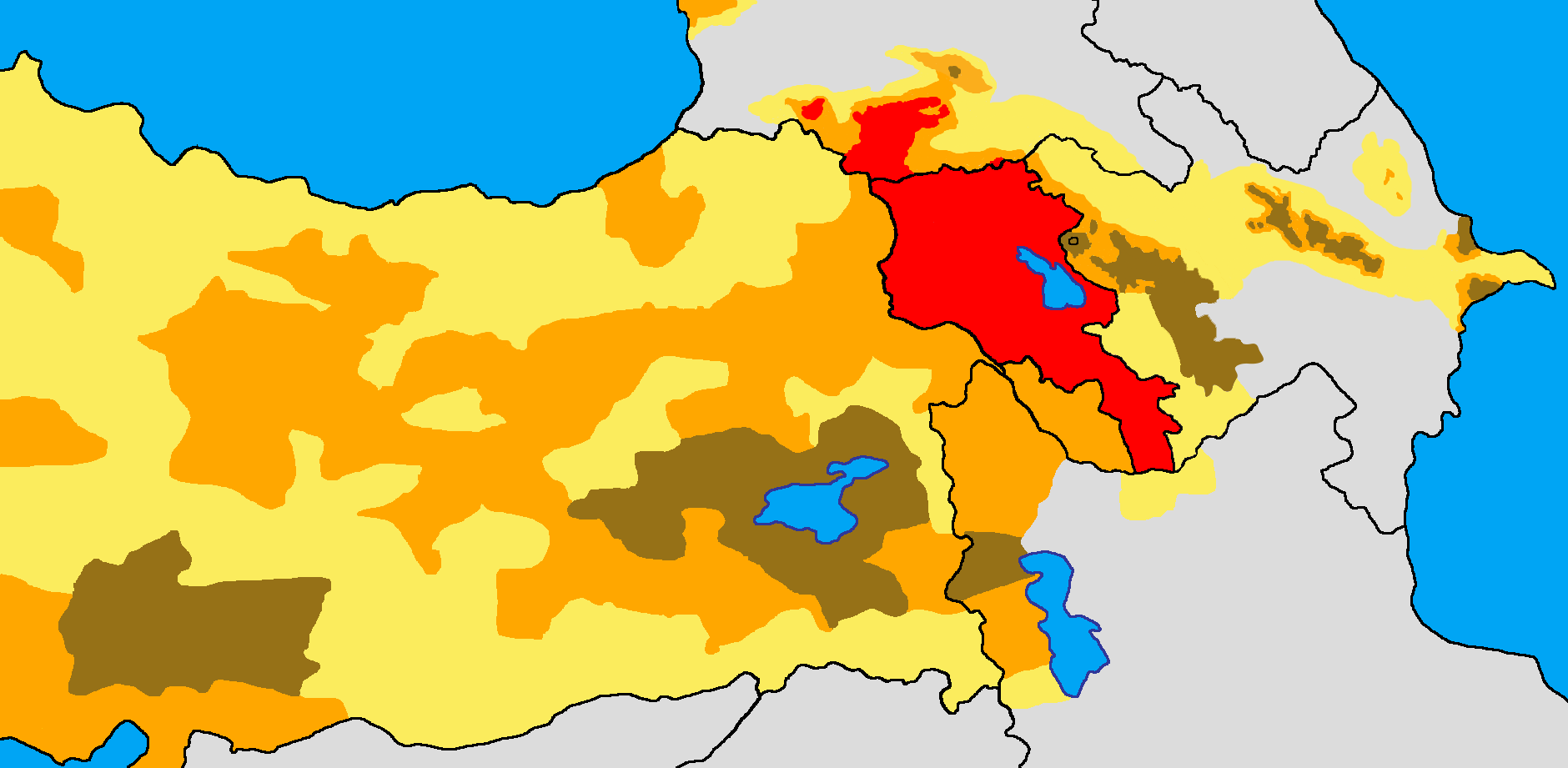
Armenian presence in the early 20th century: >50% 25–50% <25% Armenian settlement area today.

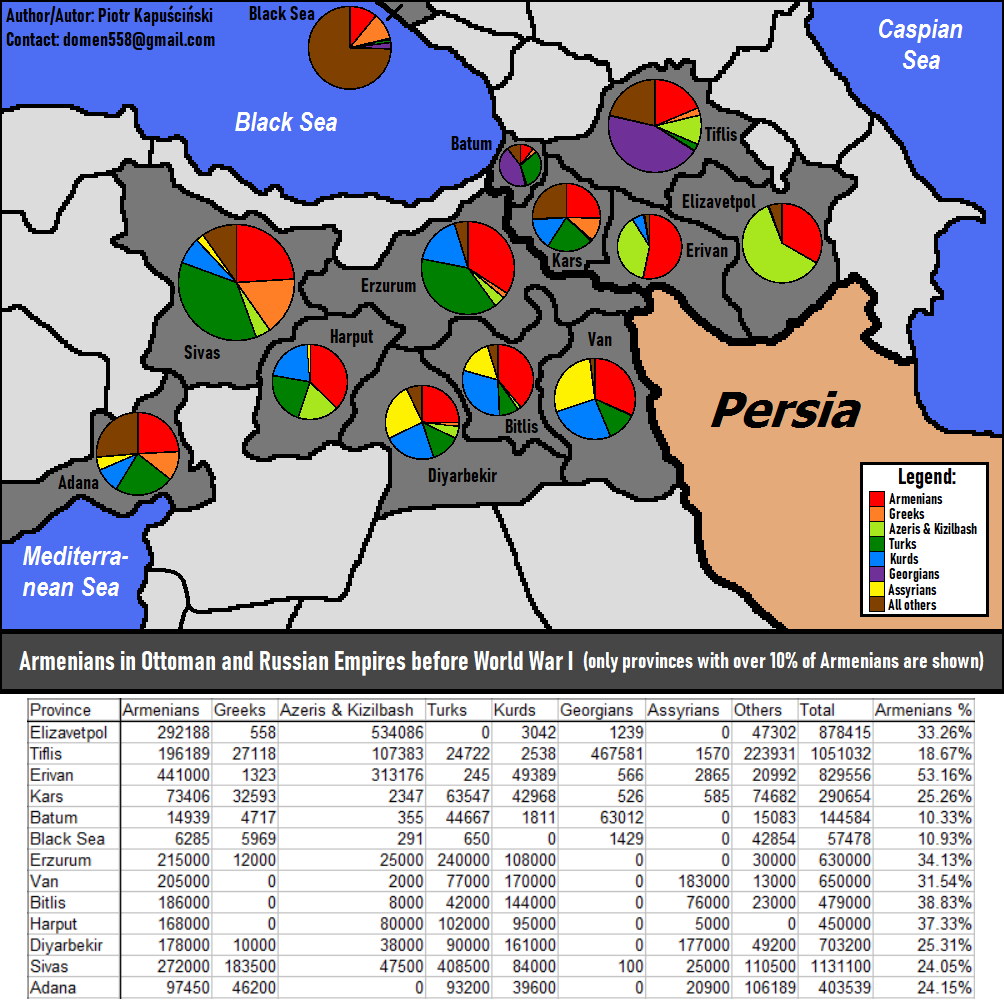
Armenians in the Ottoman Empire and the Russian Empire before World War I.

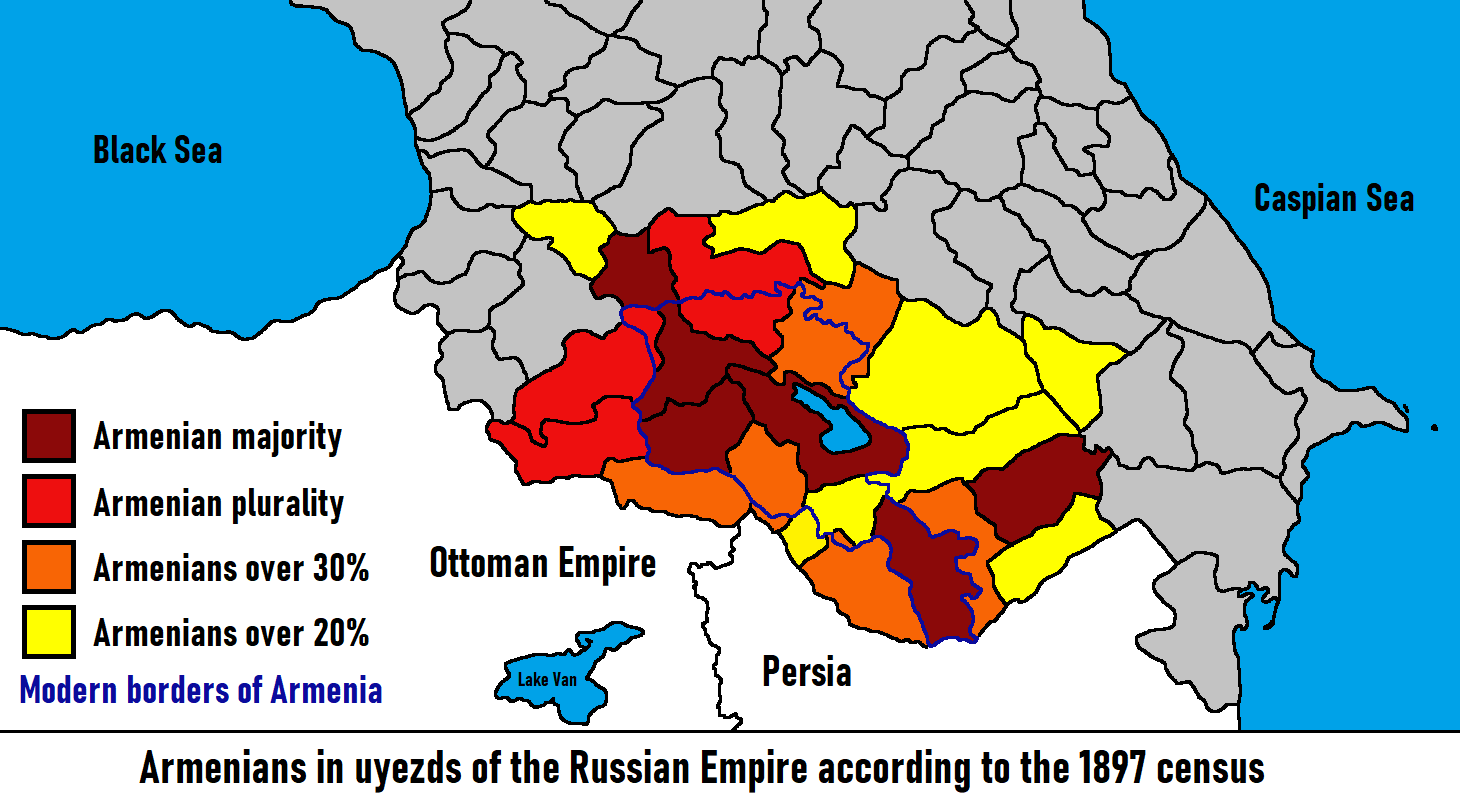
Armenians in uyezds of the Russian Empire according to the 1897 census

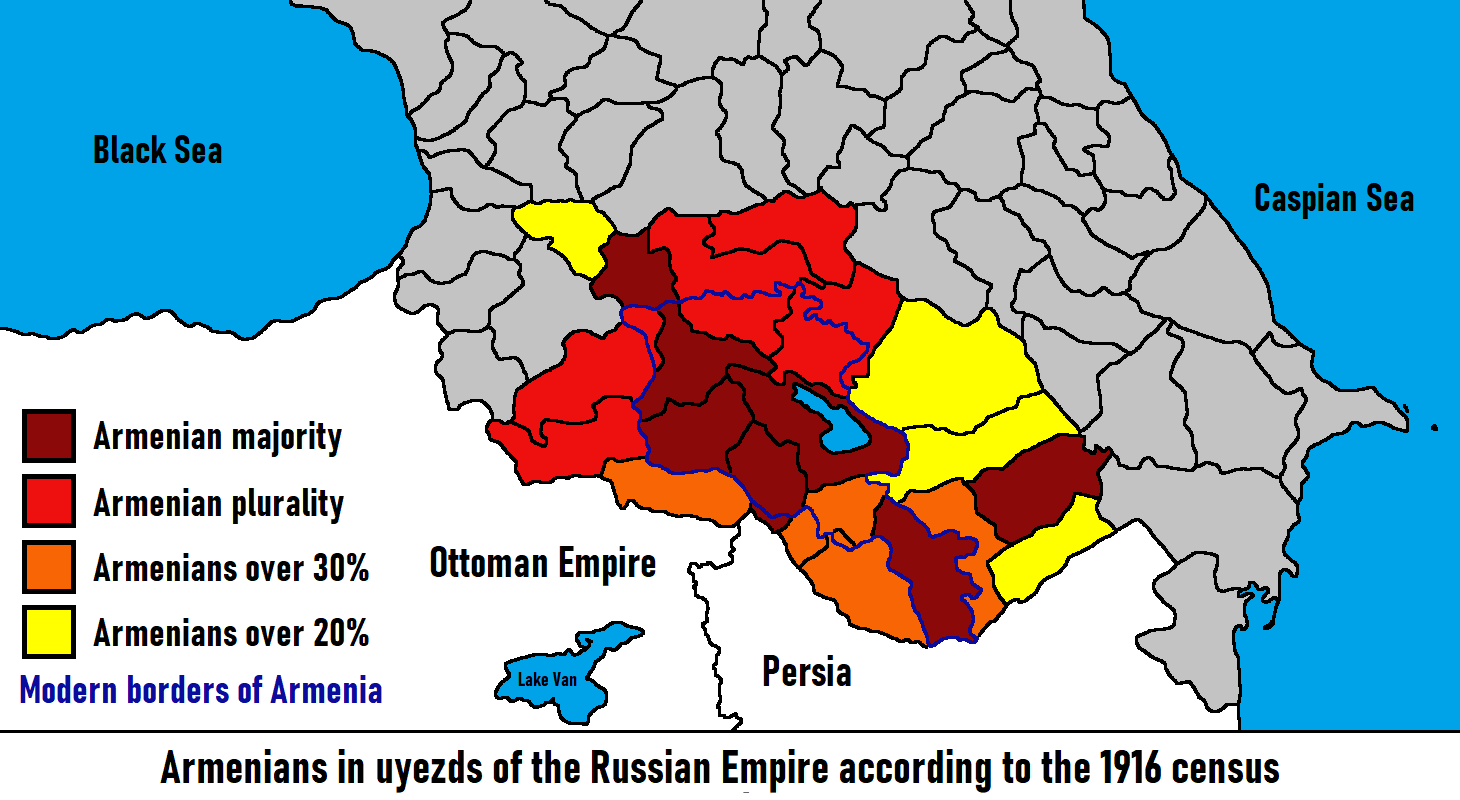
Armenians in uyezds of the Russian Empire according to the 1916 census

Armenians are indigenous to the Armenian Highlands and their presence in this region dates back 4,000 years. According to legend, Hayk, the patriarch and founder of the Armenian nation, led Armenians to victory over Bel of Babylon and settled in the Armenian Highland. Today, with a population of 3.5 million (although more recent estimates place the population closer to 2.9 million), they constitute an overwhelming majority in Armenia, Armenians in the diaspora informally refer to them as Hayastantsis (Armenian: հայաստանցի), meaning those that are from Armenia (that is, those born and raised in Armenia). They, as well as the Armenians of Iran and Russia, speak the Eastern dialect of the Armenian language. The country itself is secular as a result of Soviet domination, but most of its citizens identify themselves as Apostolic Armenian Christian.

=== Diaspora ===
While the largest Armenian diaspora populations reside in Russia, the United States, France, and other countries, small Armenian trading and religious communities have existed outside Armenia for centuries. A prominent community has continued since the 4th century in the Holy Land, and one of the quarters of the walled Old City of Jerusalem is called the Armenian Quarter. An Armenian Catholic monastic community of 35 founded in 1717 exists on an island near Venice, Italy.

The region of Western Armenia was an influential part of the Eastern Roman Empire, which was absorbed by the Ottoman Empire in the 16th century. The Armenian population of the Ottoman Empire is estimated to have been between 1.5 and 2.5 million in the early 20th century. Most of the modern Armenian diaspora consists of Armenians scattered throughout the world as a direct consequence of massacres and genocide in the Ottoman Empire. However, Armenian communities in Iran, Georgia (Tbilisi), and Syria existed since antiquity. During the Middle Ages and the centuries prior to the genocide, additional communities were formed in Greece, Bulgaria, Hungary, Kievan Rus' and the territories of Russia, Poland, Austria, and Lebanon. There are also remnants of historic communities in Turkey (Istanbul), India, Myanmar, Thailand, Belgium, the Netherlands, Portugal, Italy, Israel-Palestine, Iraq, Romania, Serbia, Ethiopia, Sudan and Egypt.

The Nagorno-Karabakh region in Azerbaijan had an overwhelming Armenian majority until 2023. From 1991 to 2023, the region was governed by the Armenia-backed Republic of Artsakh, a largely unrecognized breakway state. After Azerbaijan defeated Artsakh in 2023 after decades of conflict, nearly the entire population fled into Armenia.

Within the diasporan Armenian community, there is an unofficial classification of the different kinds of Armenians. For example, Armenians who originate from Iran are referred to as Parskahay (Armenian: պարսկահայ), while Armenians from Lebanon are usually referred to as Lipananahay (Armenian: լիբանանահայ). Armenians of the Diaspora are the primary speakers of the Western dialect of the Armenian language. This dialect has considerable differences with Eastern Armenian, but speakers of either of the two variations can usually understand each other. Eastern Armenian in the diaspora is primarily spoken in Iran and European countries such as Ukraine, Russia, and Georgia (where they form a majority in the Samtskhe-Javakheti province). In diverse communities (such as in the United States and Canada) where many different kinds of Armenians live together, there is a tendency for the different groups to cluster together.

== Culture ==
=== Religion ===
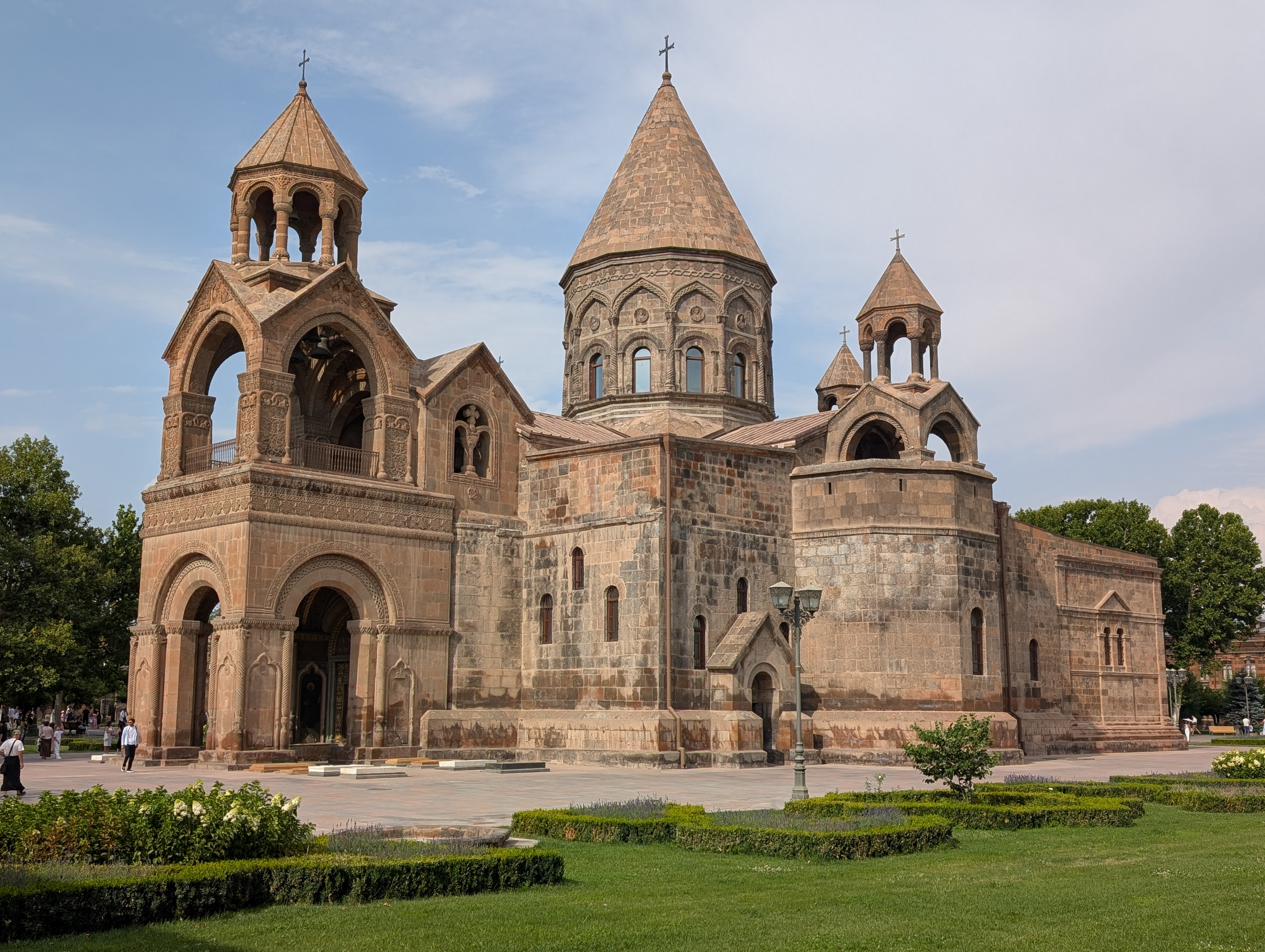
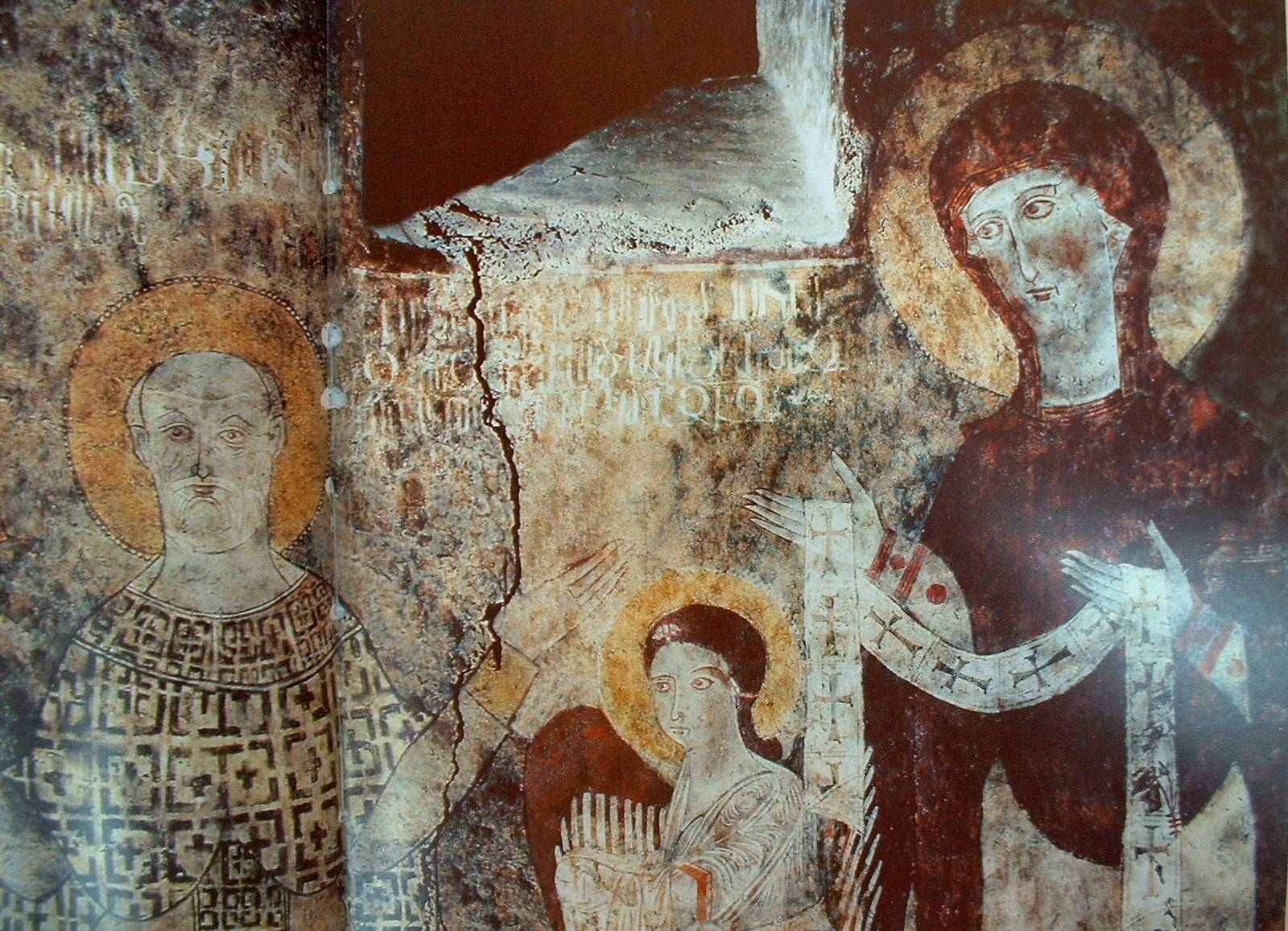
Etchmiadzin Cathedral, the mother church of the Armenian Apostolic Church, usually considered oldest cathedral in the world and located in former capital city of Vagarshapat (left). Armenian medieval fresco at Dadivank Monastery at historical Artsakh (today in Azerbaijan).

Before Christianity, Armenians adhered to Armenian Indo-European native religion: a type of indigenous polytheism that pre-dated the Urartu period but which subsequently adopted several Greco-Roman and Iranian religious characteristics.

In 301 AD, Armenia adopted Christianity as a state religion, becoming the first state to do so. The claim is primarily based on the fifth-century work of Agathangelos titled "The History of the Armenians." Agathangelos witnessed at first hand the baptism of the Armenian King Trdat III (c. 301/314 A.D.) by St. Gregory the Illuminator. Trdat III decreed Christianity was the state religion.

Armenia established a Church that still exists independently of both the Catholic and the Eastern Orthodox churches, having become so in 451 AD as a result of its stance regarding the Council of Chalcedon. Today this church is known as the Armenian Apostolic Church, which is a part of the Oriental Orthodox communion, not to be confused with the Eastern Orthodox communion. During its later political eclipses, Armenia depended on the church to preserve and protect its unique identity. The original location of the Armenian Catholicosate is Echmiadzin. However, the continuous upheavals, which characterized the political scenes of Armenia, made the political power move to safer places. The Church center moved as well to different locations together with the political authority. Therefore, it eventually moved to Cilicia as the Holy See of Cilicia.

Armenia has, at times, constituted a Christian "island" in a mostly Muslim region. There are, however, a minority of ethnic Armenian Muslims, known as Hamshenis and Crypto-Armenians, although the former are often regarded as a distinct group or subgroup. In the late Russian Caucasus, individual conversions of Muslims, Yazidis, Jews, and Assyrians into Armenian Christianity have been documented. The Armenian Kingdom of Cilicia had close ties to European Crusader States. Later on, the deteriorating situation in the region led the bishops of Armenia to elect a Catholicos in Etchmiadzin, the original seat of the Catholicosate. In 1441, a new Catholicos was elected in Etchmiadzin in the person of Kirakos Virapetsi, while Krikor Moussapegiants preserved his title as Catholicos of Cilicia. Therefore, since 1441, there have been two Catholicosates in the Armenian Church with equal rights and privileges, and with their respective jurisdictions. The primacy of honor of the Catholicosate of Etchmiadzin has always been recognized by the Catholicosate of Cilicia.

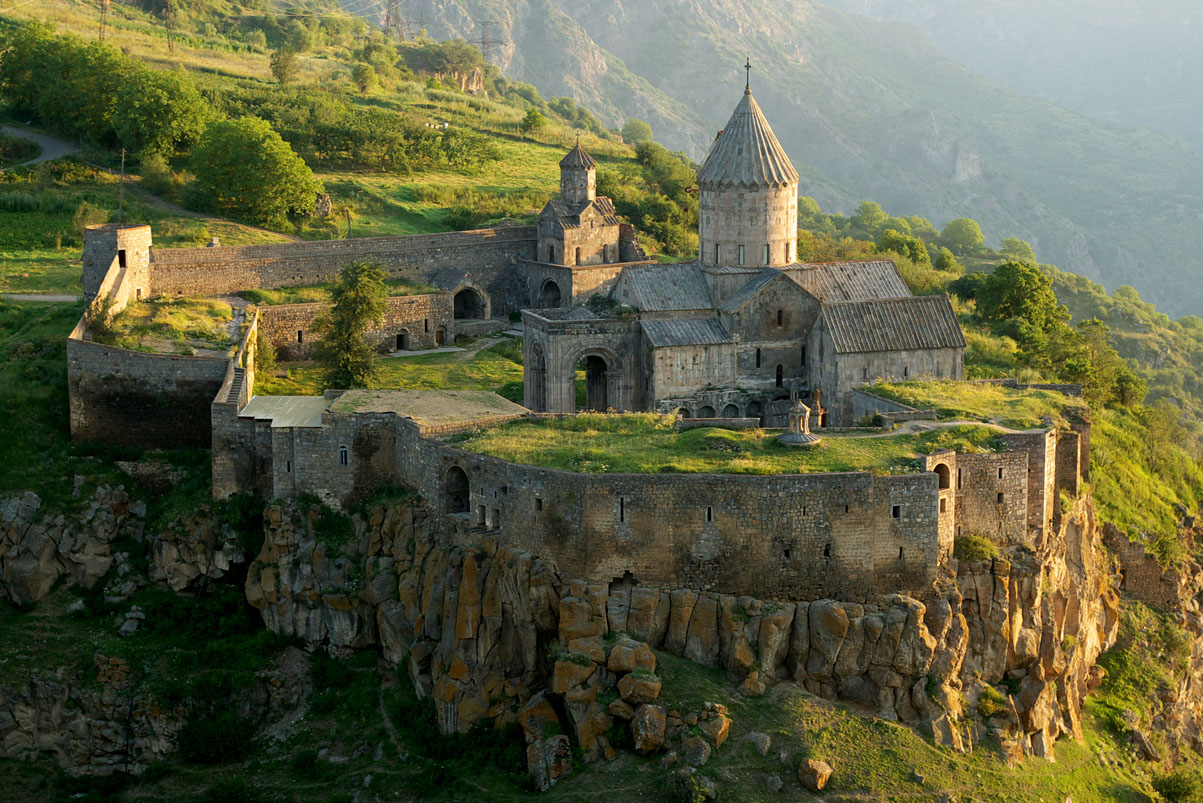
Ancient Tatev Monastery

While the Armenian Apostolic Church remains the most prominent church in the Armenian community throughout the world, Armenians (especially in the diaspora) subscribe to any number of other Christian denominations. These include the Armenian Catholic Church (which follows its own liturgy but recognizes the Roman Catholic Pope), the Armenian Evangelical Church, which started as a reformation in the Mother church but later broke away, and the Armenian Brotherhood Church, which was born in the Armenian Evangelical Church, but later broke apart from it. There are other numerous Armenian churches belonging to Protestant denominations of all kinds.

Through the ages many Armenians have collectively belonged to other faiths or Christian movements, including the Paulicians which is a form of Gnostic and Manichaean Christianity. Paulicians sought to restore the pure Christianity of Paul and in c.660 founded the first congregation in Kibossa, Armenia.

Another example is the Tondrakians, who flourished in medieval Armenia between the early 9th century and 11th century. Tondrakians advocated the abolishment of the church, denied the immortality of the soul, did not believe in an afterlife, supported property rights for peasants, and equality between men and women.

The Orthodox Armenians or the Chalcedonian Armenians in the Byzantine Empire were called Iberians ("Georgians") or "Greeks". A notable Orthodox "Iberian" Armenian was the Byzantine General Gregory Pakourianos. The descendants of these Orthodox and Chalcedonic Armenians are the Hayhurum of Greece and Catholic Armenians of Georgia.

=== Language and literature ===
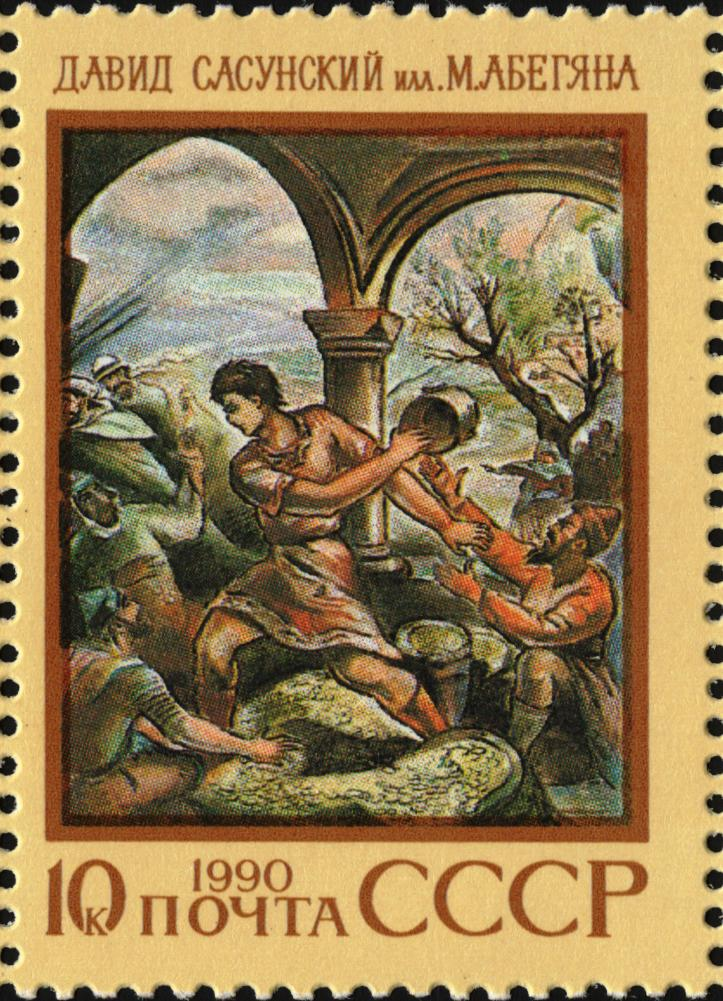
Soviet stamp showing scene from Armenian national epic Daredevils of Sassoun preserved by oral tradition (left). Armenian illuminated manuscript created by Toros Roslin.

Armenian is a sub-branch of the Indo-European family, and with some 8 million speakers one of the smallest surviving branches. Today, that branch has just one language – Armenian.

Five million Eastern Armenian speakers live in the Caucasus, Russia, and Iran, and approximately two to three million people in the rest of the Armenian diaspora speak Western Armenian. According to US Census figures, there are 300,000 Americans who speak Armenian at home. It is in fact the twentieth most commonly spoken language in the United States, having slightly fewer speakers than Haitian Creole, and slightly more than Navajo.

Armenian literature dates back to 400 AD, when Mesrop Mashtots first invented the Armenian alphabet. This period of time is often viewed as the Golden Age of Armenian literature. Early Armenian literature was written by the "father of Armenian history", Moses of Chorene, who authored The History of Armenia. The book covers the time-frame from the formation of the Armenian people to the fifth century AD. The nineteenth century beheld a great literary movement that was to give rise to modern Armenian literature. This period of time, during which Armenian culture flourished, is known as the Revival period (Zartonki sherchan). The Revivalist authors of Constantinople and Tiflis, almost identical to the Romanticists of Europe, were interested in encouraging Armenian nationalism. Most of them adopted the newly created Eastern or Western variants of the Armenian language depending on the targeted audience, and preferred them over classical Armenian (grabar). This period ended after the Hamidian massacres, when Armenians experienced turbulent times. As Armenian history of the 1920s and of the Genocide came to be more openly discussed, writers like Paruyr Sevak, Gevork Emin, Silva Kaputikyan and Hovhannes Shiraz began a new era of literature.

=== Architecture ===
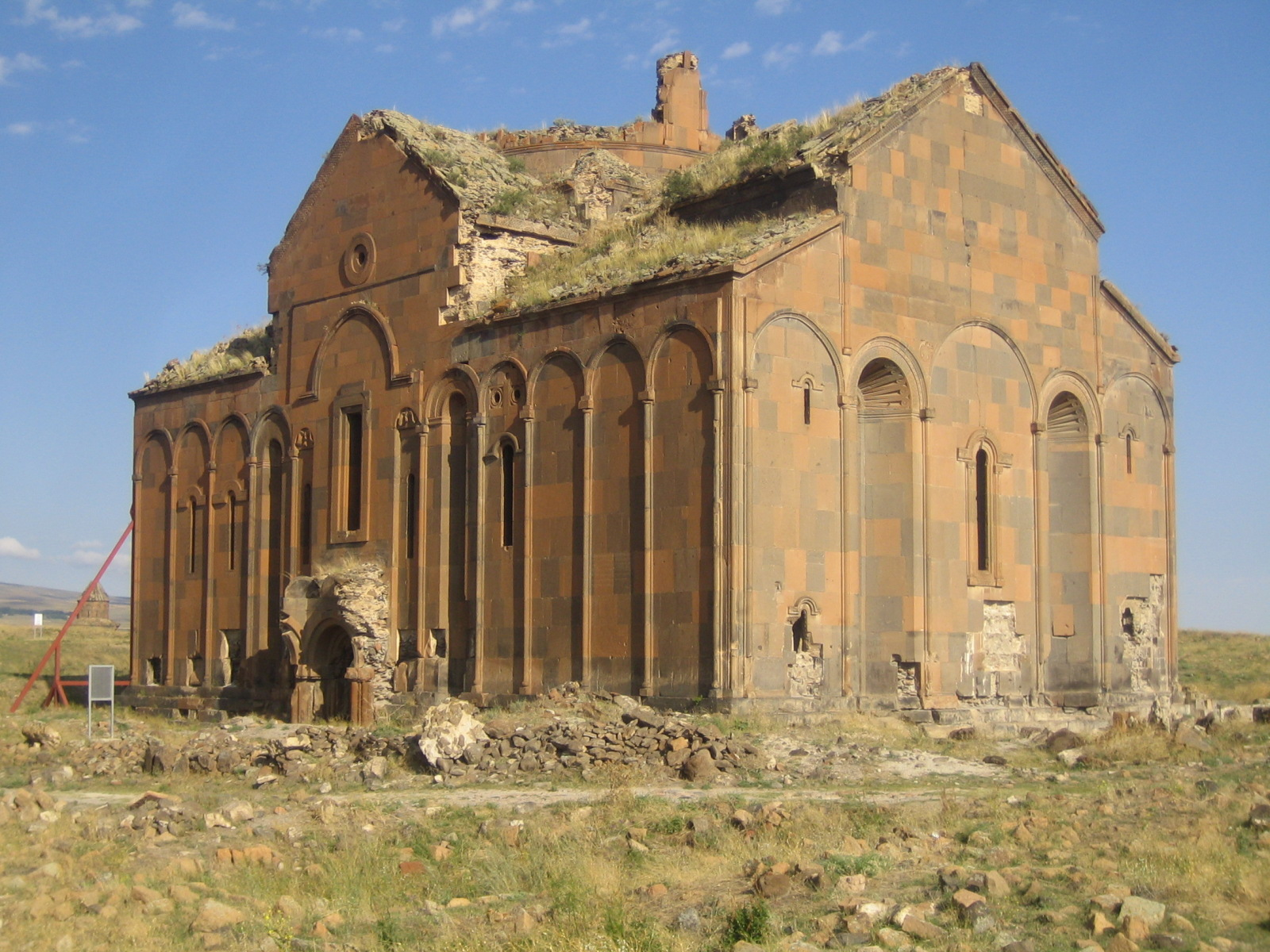
The Cathedral of Ani, completed in 1001

The first Armenian churches were built on the orders of St. Gregory the Illuminator, and were often built on top of pagan temples, and imitated some aspects of Armenian pre-Christian architecture.

Classical and Medieval Armenian Architecture is divided into four separate periods. The first Armenian churches were built between the 4th and 7th century, beginning when Armenia converted to Christianity, and ending with the Arab invasion of Armenia. The early churches were mostly simple basilicas, but some with side apses. By the fifth century the typical cupola cone in the center had become widely used. By the seventh century, centrally planned churches had been built and a more complicated niched buttress and radiating Hrip'simé style had formed. By the time of the Arab invasion, most of what we now know as classical Armenian architecture had formed.

From the 9th to 11th century, Armenian architecture underwent a revival under the patronage of the Bagratid Dynasty with a great deal of building done in the area of Lake Van, this included both traditional styles and new innovations. Ornately carved Armenian Khachkars were developed during this time. Many new cities and churches were built during this time, including a new capital at Lake Van and a new Cathedral on Akdamar Island to match. The Cathedral of Ani was also completed during this dynasty. It was during this time that the first major monasteries, such as Haghpat and Haritchavank were built. This period was ended by the Seljuk invasion.

=== Art ===
Armenian art is the unique form of art developed over the last five millennia in which the Armenian people lived on the Armenian Highland. Armenian architecture and miniature painting have dominated Armenian art and have shown consistent development over the centuries. Other forms of Armenian art include sculpture, fresco, mosaic, ceramic, metalwork, engraving, and textiles, especially Armenian carpets.

Prehistoric Armenia was home to the Urartu culture in the Iron Age, notable for its early metal sculptures, often of animals. The region was, as later, often contested by the large empires holding the nearby regions of Persia, Mesopotamia and Anatolia. The Armenians adopted Christianity very early, and developed their own version of Eastern Christian art, with much use of icons, Armenian miniatures in books, and the very original architecture of their churches and monasteries. A distinctive Armenian feature, which may have influenced the Medieval art of Europe, was the popularity from early on of figurative relief carvings on the outside of churches, unknown in Byzantium.

Armenians specialized in arts and crafts such as carpet-weaving.

Medival khachkar from Haghpat Monastery, showing crucifixion of Jesus.

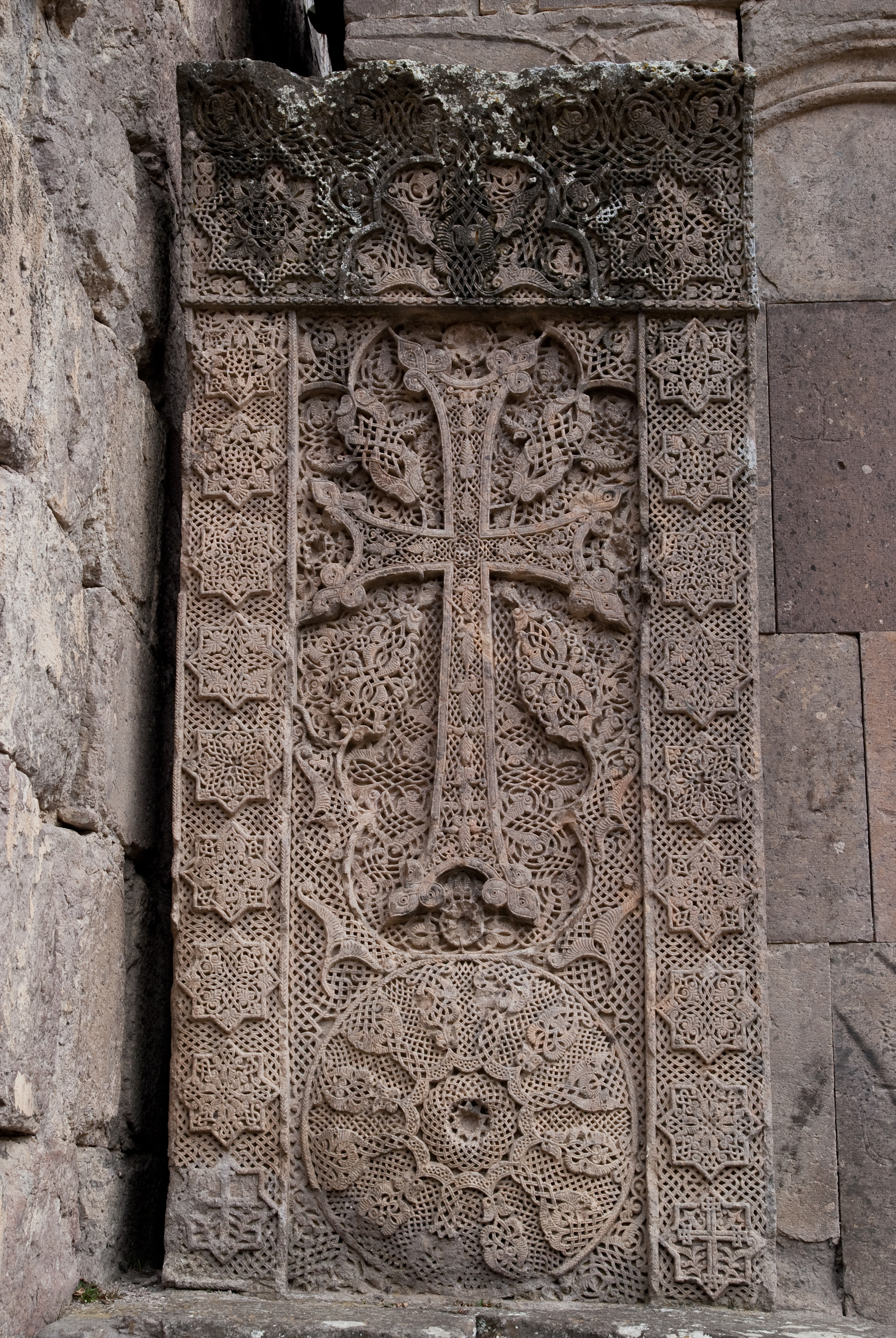
Khachkar at Goshavank monastery carved in 1291 by the artist Poghos.

=== Dress ===
The Armenian Taraz (Armenian: տարազ, taraz; (Note: Western Armenian pronunciation: daraz)), also known as Armenian traditional clothing, reflects a rich cultural tradition. Wool and fur were used by the Armenians along with the cotton that was grown in the fertile valleys. In Urartu, silk imported from China was used by royalty. Later, Armenians cultivated silkworms and produced their own silk.

=== Theatre ===
Armenian theatre (Armenian: Հայկական թատրոն, romanized: Haykakan t’atron) dates to before Roman times and is one of the oldest Eurasian theatrical traditions. Alongside Greek and Roman theatres, it stands as one of the world's most ancient theatres. The ancient and beloved form of theatrical art is lyrical (profound) drama, which exerted its influence on the folklore of the Near East, Balkan, and Apennine peoples. Within this cultural context, Armenian folk and mystical drama, characterized by its dance elements, also took shape. Although the ancient theatre system has not been preserved, it has left its linguistic marks.

=== Sports ===
Many types of sports are played in Armenia, among the most popular being football, chess, boxing, basketball, ice hockey, sambo, wrestling, weightlifting, and volleyball. Since independence, the Armenian government has been actively rebuilding its sports program in the country.

During Soviet rule, Armenian athletes rose to prominence winning plenty of medals and helping the USSR win the medal standings at the Olympics on numerous occasions. The first medal won by an Armenian in modern Olympic history was by Hrant Shahinyan, who won two golds and two silvers in gymnastics at the 1952 Summer Olympics in Helsinki. To highlight the level of success of Armenians in the Olympics, Shahinyan was quoted as saying:

"Armenian sportsmen had to outdo their opponents by several notches for the shot at being accepted into any Soviet team. But those difficulties notwithstanding, 90 percent of Armenian athletes on Soviet Olympic teams came back with medals."

In football, their most successful team was Yerevan's FC Ararat, which had claimed most of the Soviet championships in the 70s and had also gone to post victories against professional clubs like FC Bayern Munich in the Euro cup. Notable players include Henrikh Mkhitaryan, Youri Djorkaeff, Alain Boghossian, Andranik Eskandarian, Andranik Teymourian, Edgar Manucharyan, Khoren Oganesian and Nikita Simonyan.

Armenians have also been successful in chess, which is the most popular mind sport in Armenia. Some of the most prominent chess players in the world are Armenian such as Tigran Petrosian and Levon Aronian. Garry Kasparov is half-Armenian through his mother. As a nation, Armenia won the World Champion in 2011 and the World Chess Olympiad on three occasions.

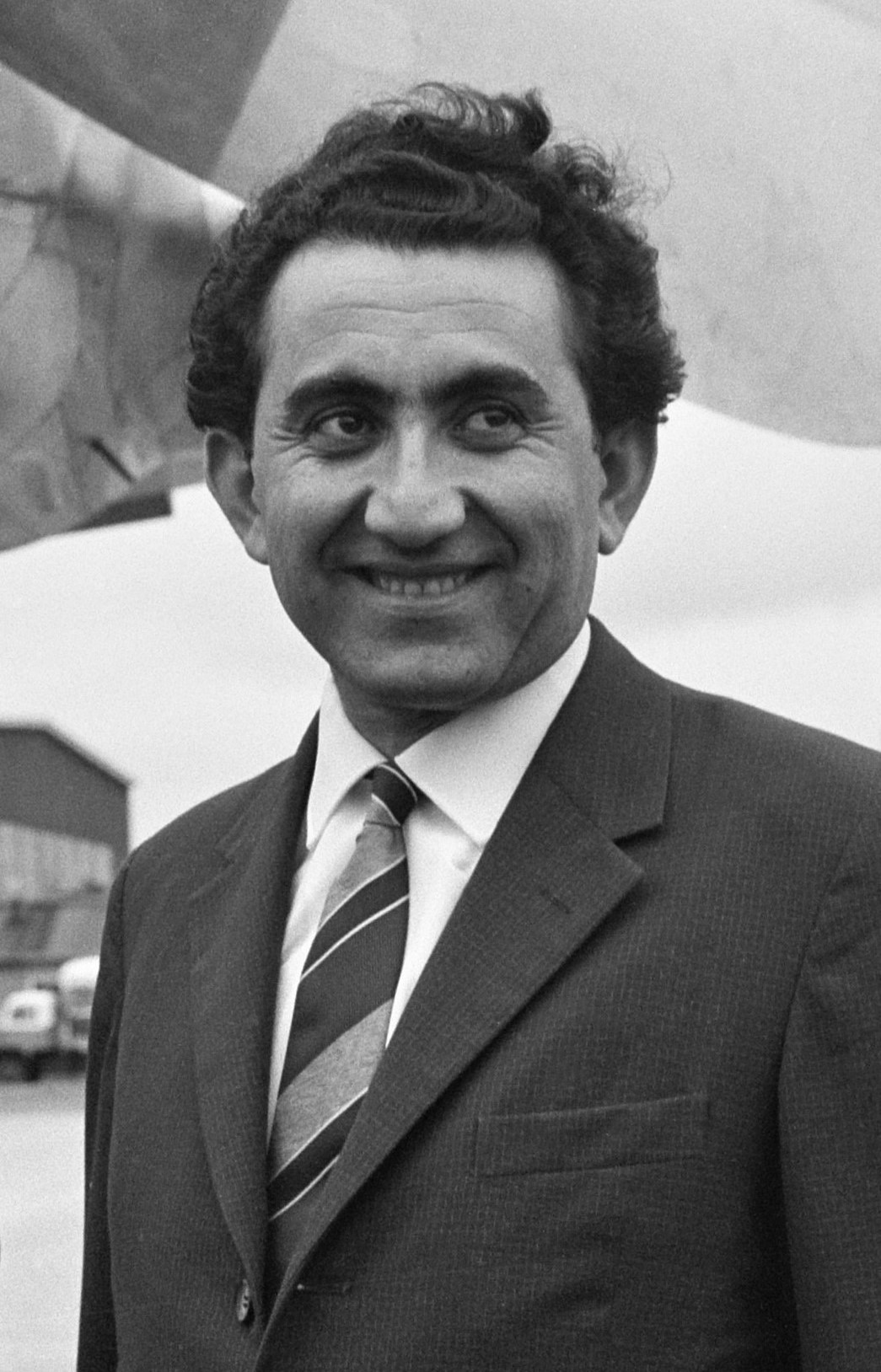
Tigran Petrosyan, 9th World Chess Champion.

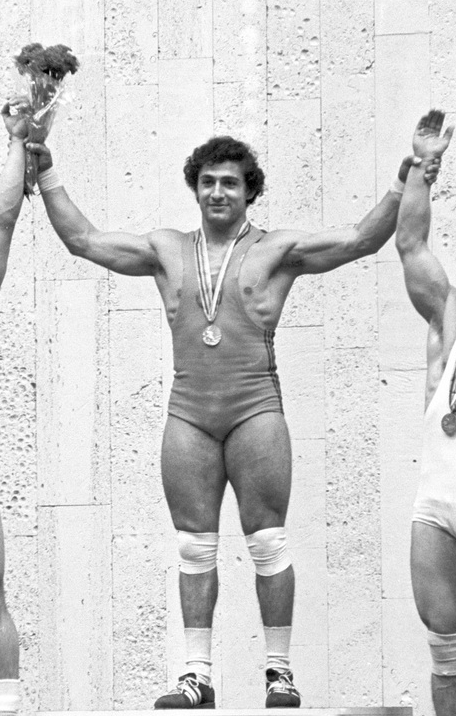
Yuri Vardanyan, weightlifter and Olympic Champion, during his career he set 41 world record.

Armenians have also been successful in weightlifting and wrestling, the latter having been a successful sport in the Olympics for Armenia. At the 1996 Summer Olympics in Atlanta, Armen Nazaryan won the gold in the Men's Greco-Roman Flyweight (52 kg) category and Armen Mkrtchyan won the silver in Men's Freestyle Paperweight (48 kg) category, securing Armenia's first two medals in its Olympic history. There are also successful Armenians in boxing: Arthur Abraham and Vic Darchinyan.

=== Music and dance ===
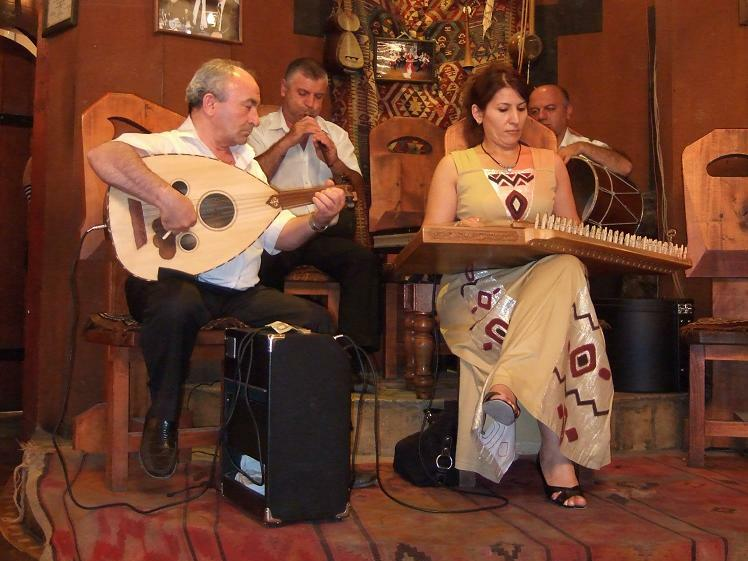
Armenian folk musicans.

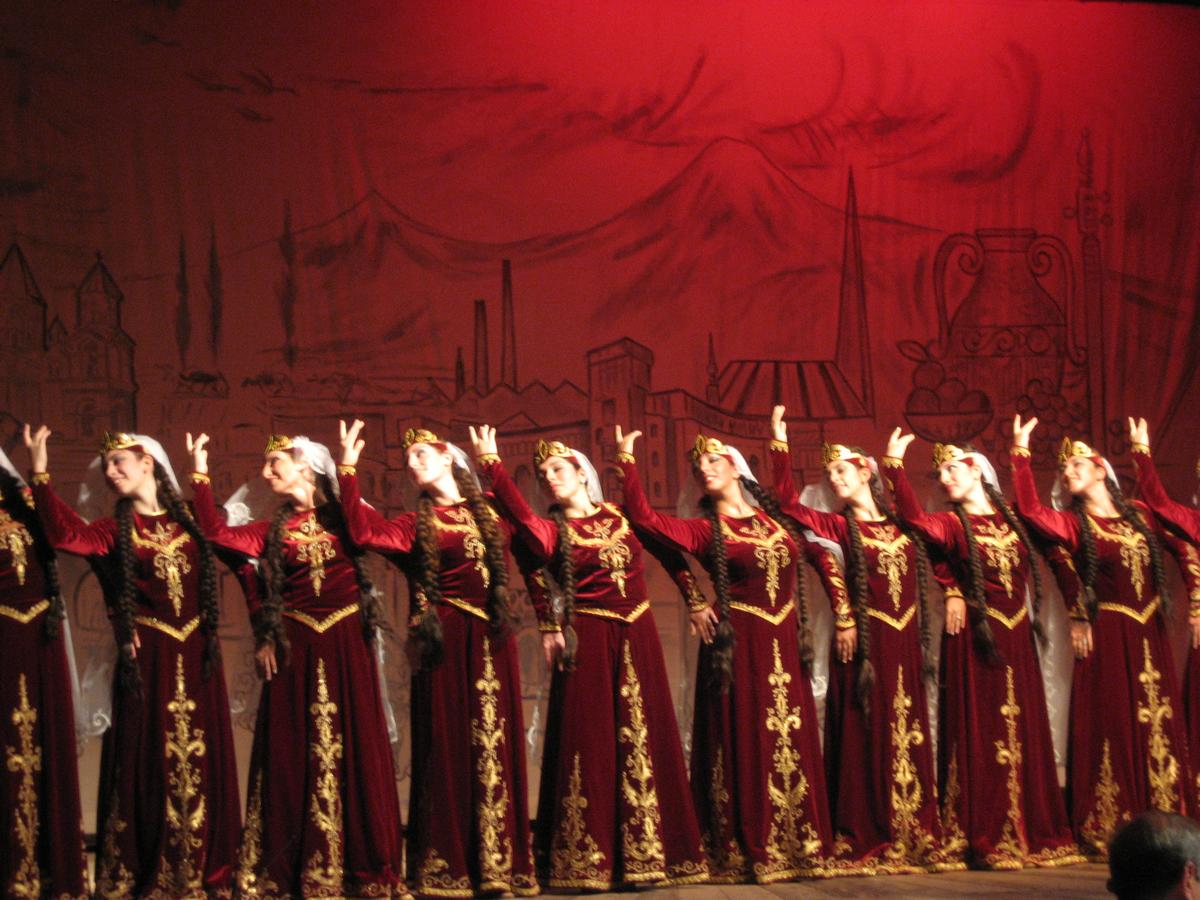
Armenian girls performing traditional Armenian dance.

Armenian music is a mix of indigenous folk music, perhaps best-represented by Djivan Gasparyan's well-known duduk music, as well as light pop, and extensive Christian music.

Instruments like the duduk, the dhol, the zurna and the kanun are commonly found in Armenian folk music. Artists such as Sayat Nova are famous due to their influence in the development of Armenian folk music. One of the oldest types of Armenian music is the Armenian chant which is the most common kind of religious music in Armenia. Many of these chants are ancient in origin, extending to pre-Christian times, while others are relatively modern, including several composed by Saint Mesrop Mashtots, the inventor of the Armenian alphabet. While under Soviet rule, Armenian classical music composer Aram Khatchaturian became internationally well known for his music, for various ballets and the Sabre Dance from his composition for the ballet Gayane.

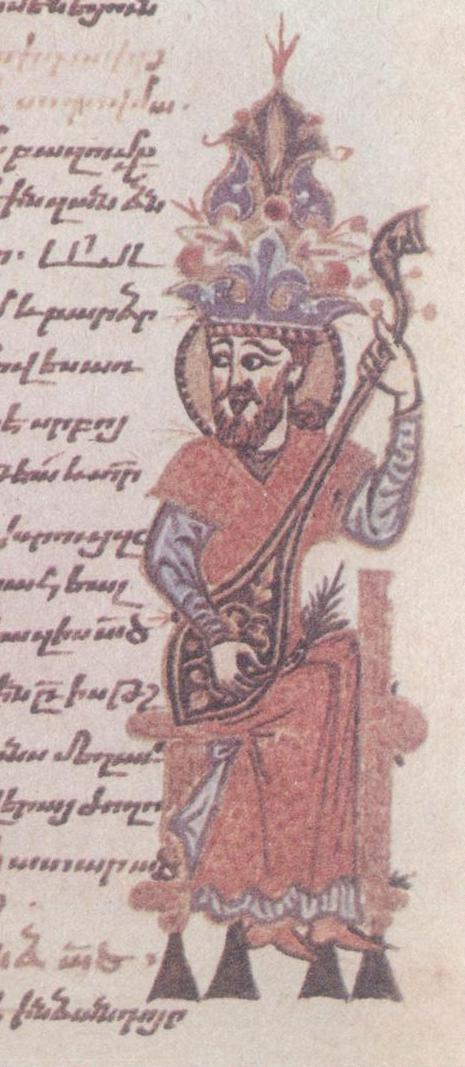
Matenadaran, manuscript no. 346, p., 280a. Armenian musician with saz in hand from Ancient Armenia.

The Armenian genocide caused widespread emigration that led to the settlement of Armenians in various countries in the world. Armenians kept to their traditions and certain diasporans rose to fame with their music. In the post-Genocide Armenian community of the United States, the so-called "kef" style Armenian dance music, using Armenian and Middle Eastern folk instruments (often electrified/amplified) and some western instruments, was popular. This style preserved the folk songs and dances of Western Armenia, and many artists also played the contemporary popular songs of Turkey and other Middle Eastern countries from which the Armenians emigrated. Richard Hagopian is perhaps the most famous artist of the traditional "kef" style and the Vosbikian Band was notable in the 40s and 50s for developing their own style of "kef music" heavily influenced by the popular American Big Band Jazz of the time. Later, stemming from the Middle Eastern Armenian diaspora and influenced by Continental European (especially French) pop music, the Armenian pop music genre grew to fame in the 60s and 70s with artists such as Adiss Harmandian and Harout Pamboukjian performing to the Armenian diaspora and Armenia. Also with artists such as Sirusho, performing pop music combined with Armenian folk music in today's entertainment industry. Other Armenian diasporans that rose to fame in classical or international music circles are world-renowned French-Armenian singer and composer Charles Aznavour, pianist Sahan Arzruni, prominent opera sopranos such as Hasmik Papian and more recently Isabel Bayrakdarian and Anna Kasyan. Certain Armenians settled to sing non-Armenian tunes such as the heavy metal band System of a Down (which nonetheless often incorporates traditional Armenian instrumentals and styling into their songs) or pop star Cher (whose father was Armenian). Ruben Hakobyan (Ruben Sasuntsi) is a well recognized Armenian ethnographic and patriotic folk singer who has achieved widespread national recognition due to his devotion to Armenian folk music and exceptional talent. In the Armenian diaspora, Armenian Revolutionary Songs are popular with the youth. These songs encourage Armenian patriotism and are generally about Armenian history and national heroes.

=== Carpet weaving ===
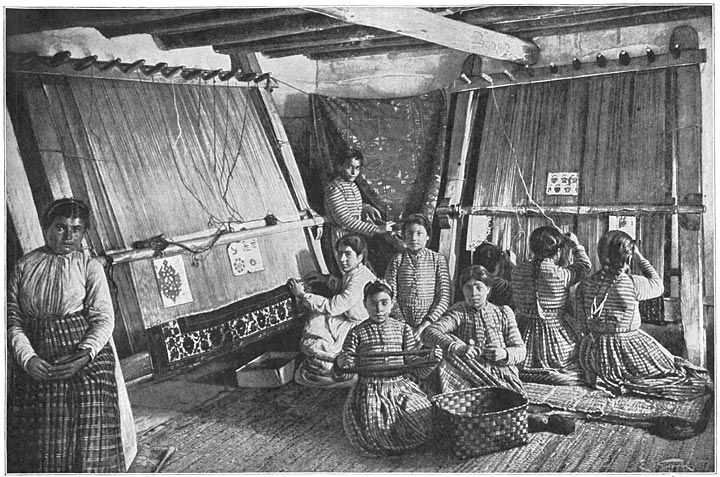
Armenian girls, weaving carpets in Van, 1907, Ottoman Empire.

Carpet-weaving is historically a major traditional profession for the majority of Armenian women, including many Armenian families. Prominent Karabakh carpet weavers there were men too. The oldest extant Armenian carpet from the region, referred to as Artsakh (see also Karabakh carpet) during the medieval era, is from the village of Banants (near Gandzak) and dates to the early 13th century. The first time that the Armenian word for carpet, kork, was used in historical sources was in a 1242–1243 Armenian inscription on the wall of the Kaptavan Church in Artsakh.

Common themes and patterns found on Armenian carpets were the depiction of dragons and eagles. They were diverse in style, rich in color and ornamental motifs, and were even separated in categories depending on what sort of animals were depicted on them, such as artsvagorgs (eagle-carpets), vishapagorgs (dragon-carpets) and otsagorgs (serpent-carpets). The rug mentioned in the Kaptavan inscriptions is composed of three arches, "covered with vegatative ornaments", and bears an artistic resemblance to the illuminated manuscripts produced in Artsakh.

The art of carpet weaving was in addition intimately connected to the making of curtains as evidenced in a passage by Kirakos Gandzaketsi, a 13th-century Armenian historian from Artsakh, who praised Arzu-Khatun, the wife of regional prince Vakhtang Khachenatsi, and her daughters for their expertise and skill in weaving.

Armenian carpets were also renowned by foreigners who traveled to Artsakh; the Arab geographer and historian Al-Masudi noted that, among other works of art, he had never seen such carpets elsewhere in his life.

=== Cuisine ===
Armenians baking lavash, Western Armenia, 1906.

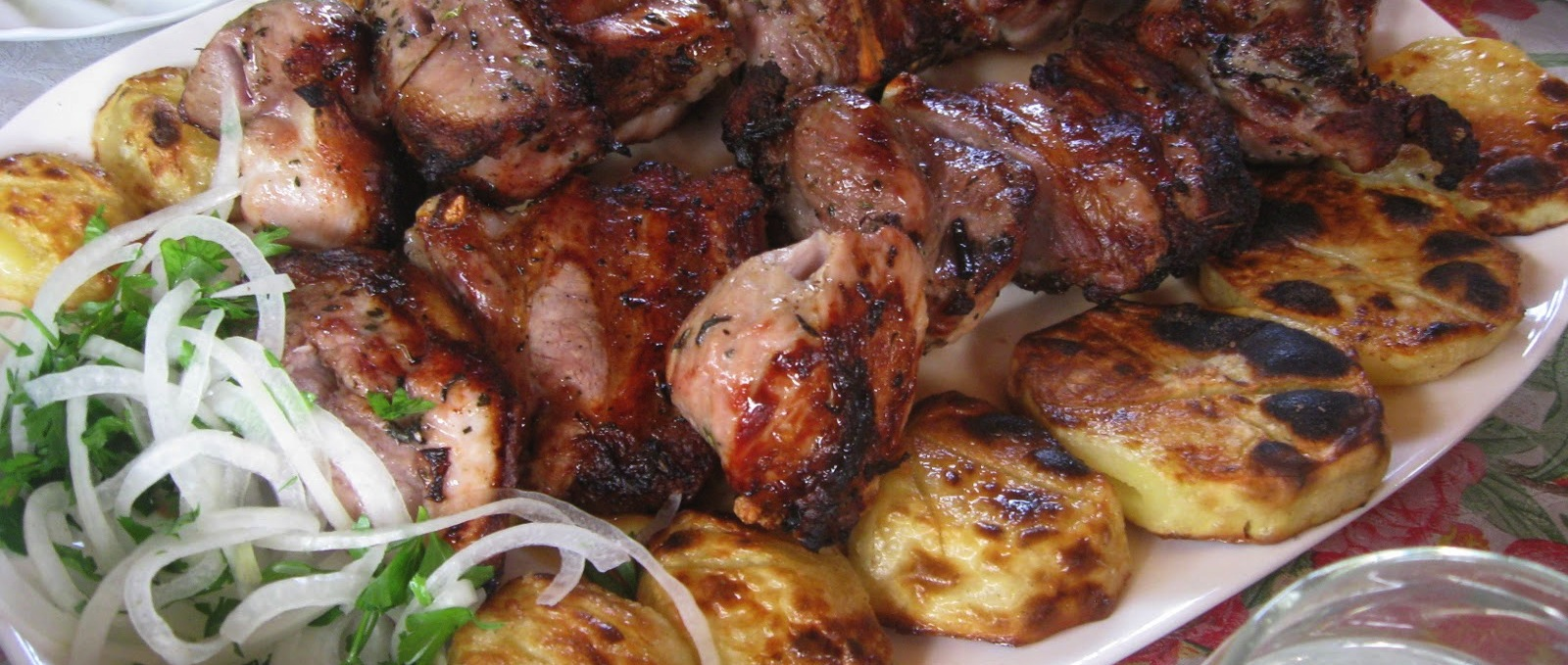
Khorovats, popular Armenian food among Armenians.

Khorovats, an Armenian-styled barbecue, is arguably the favorite Armenian dish. Lavash is a very popular Armenian flat bread, and Armenian paklava is a popular dessert made from filo dough. Other famous Armenian foods include the kabob (a skewer of marinated roasted meat and vegetables), various dolmas (minced lamb, or beef meat and rice wrapped in grape leaves, cabbage leaves, or stuffed into hollowed vegetables), and pilaf, a rice dish. Also, ghapama, a rice-stuffed pumpkin dish, and many different salads are popular in Armenian culture. Fruits play a large part in the Armenian diet. Apricots (Prunus armeniaca, also known as Armenian Plum) have been grown in Armenia for centuries and have a reputation for having an especially good flavor. Peaches are popular as well, as are grapes, figs, pomegranates, and melons. Preserves are made from many fruits, including cornelian cherries, young walnuts, sea buckthorn, mulberries, sour cherries, and many others.

== Institutions ==
- The Armenian Apostolic Church, the world's oldest national church
- The Armenian General Benevolent Union (AGBU) founded in 1906 and the largest Armenian non-profit organization in the world, with educational, cultural and humanitarian projects on all continents
- The Armenian Revolutionary Federation, founded in 1890. It is generally referred to as the Dashnaktsutyun, which means 'federation' in Armenian. The ARF is the strongest worldwide Armenian political organization and the only diasporan Armenian organization with a significant political presence in Armenia.
- Hamazkayin, an Armenian cultural and educational society founded in Cairo in 1928, and responsible for the founding of Armenian secondary schools and institutions of higher education in several countries
- The Armenian Catholic Church, representing small communities of Armeno-Catholics in different countries around the world, as well as important monastic and cultural institutions in Venice and Vienna
- Homenetmen, an Armenian Scouting and athletic organization founded in 1910 with a worldwide membership of about 25,000
- The Armenian Relief Society, founded in 1910

== Genetics ==
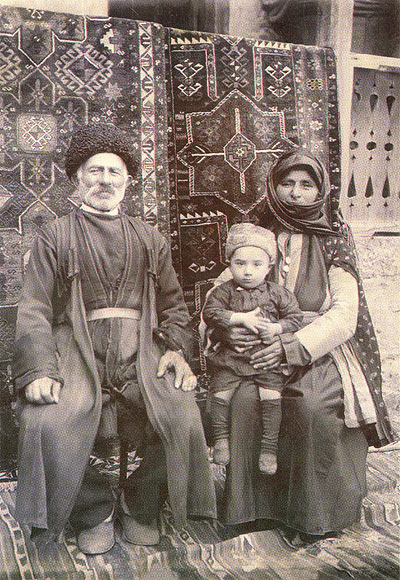
Armenian family from Karabakh, first half of 20th century

=== Y-DNA ===
A 2012 study found that haplogroups R1b, J2, G and T were the most notable haplogroups among Armenians.

=== MtDNA ===
Most notable mtDNA haplogroups among the Armenian samples are H, U, T, J, K and X while the rest of remaining Mtdna of the Armenians are HV, I, X, W, R0 and N.

== See also ==
- Armenian diaspora
- Ethnic groups in Europe
- Ethnic groups in West Asia
- Hayk
- Hemshin peoples
- Hidden Armenians
- List of Armenian ethnic enclaves
- Peoples of the Caucasus
- Prehistory of the Armenians
