= Armenians in the Netherlands =

Armenians in the Netherlands Armeniërs in Nederland Հոլանդահայեր
- (Armenia) (Netherlands)

Total population
- 40.000

Regions with significant populations

Languages
- Armenian, Dutch As well as Persian, Russian, Turkish, and/or Arabic as second or third languages

Religion
- Armenian Apostolic, Armenian Catholic, Evangelical and Protestant

Related ethnic groups
- Armenians, Hamshenis, Cherkesogai groups

Armenians in the Netherlands (Dutch: Armeniërs in Nederland; Armenian: Հոլանդահայեր, romanized: Holandahayer), also Dutch Armenians (Nederlandse Armenen) or Armenian Dutch (Armeense Nederlanders), are the ethnic Armenians living in the Netherlands. The number of Armenians living in the country is around 40.000, according to the Armenian ambassador.

== History ==
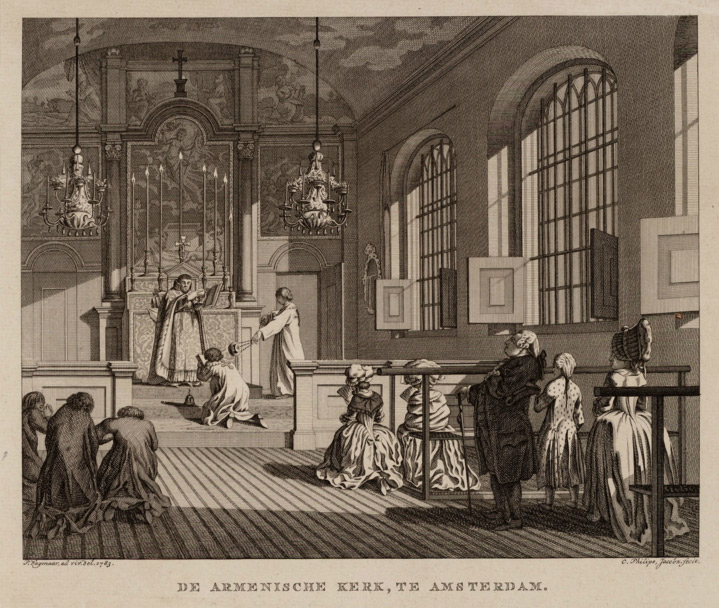
Armenian Church in Amsterdam, 1783

Armenian and Dutch interactions are believed to have started in the 13th and 14th centuries, when Dutch merchants arrived in Cilicia and Armenian trading houses opened in the Low Countries. Armenians brought into the Low Countries carpets, dyes, cotton, and spices from Armenia and from around the world.

Apart from the contemporary Armenian community spread out over the Netherlands, there had been an independent Armenian community concentrated in Amsterdam during the 17th and 18th centuries.

Many Armenian merchants in Amsterdam went to Southeast Asia in the 19th century to trade, and to set up factories and plantations, establishing a community of Armenians in Java.

The Napoleonic Wars put an end to the Armenian life in the Netherlands. The city of Amsterdam was almost depopulated after its occupation by the French. In 1713 the city of Amsterdam permitted the Armenians to erect a church of their own. After serving its purpose for about a century and a half, this edifice was closed because of the dwindling of its congregation. In 1874, by order of the Catholicos of Echmiadzin, the building was sold for 10,000 florins, which was transmitted to him. It is probable that the Armenian community assimilated into the wider Dutch nation during the 19th century.

Armenians arrived in the Netherlands from Indonesia (the former Dutch Indies in the 1950s), Turkey (1970s), Lebanon (1970s), Iran (1980s), Iraq (early 1990s), Russia and Armenia (1990s).

== Community ==
The largest group of Armenians arrived from Turkey (Diyarbakir and Şırnak) in the 1970s as guest workers in chain migration, finding employment in textile plants in Almelo and Hengelo.

Currently most Armenians live in the major urban centres in the western part of the Netherlands: Amsterdam, Dordrecht, The Hague, Leiden and Rotterdam. Armenian church services are held in Amsterdam, Maastricht and Almelo.

== Notable people ==
- Gago Aroetjunjan – kickboxer and Muay Thai fighter
- Sahak Parparyan, kickboxer and Muay Thai fighter
- Biurakn Hakhverdian – water polo player, olympic gold medalist and former captain of the Dutch national junior water polo team
- Stephanie Tency, crowned Miss Universe Netherlands 2013 and represented her country at the Miss Universe 2013
- Karapet Karapetyan, kickboxer
- Gegard Mousasi, mixed martial artist
- Aras Özbiliz, football player

== See also ==
- Armenia–Netherlands relations
- Armenian diaspora
- List of Armenians
- Immigration to the Netherlands
