= Tigran Balayan =

Armenian diplomat

- Տիգրան Բալայան
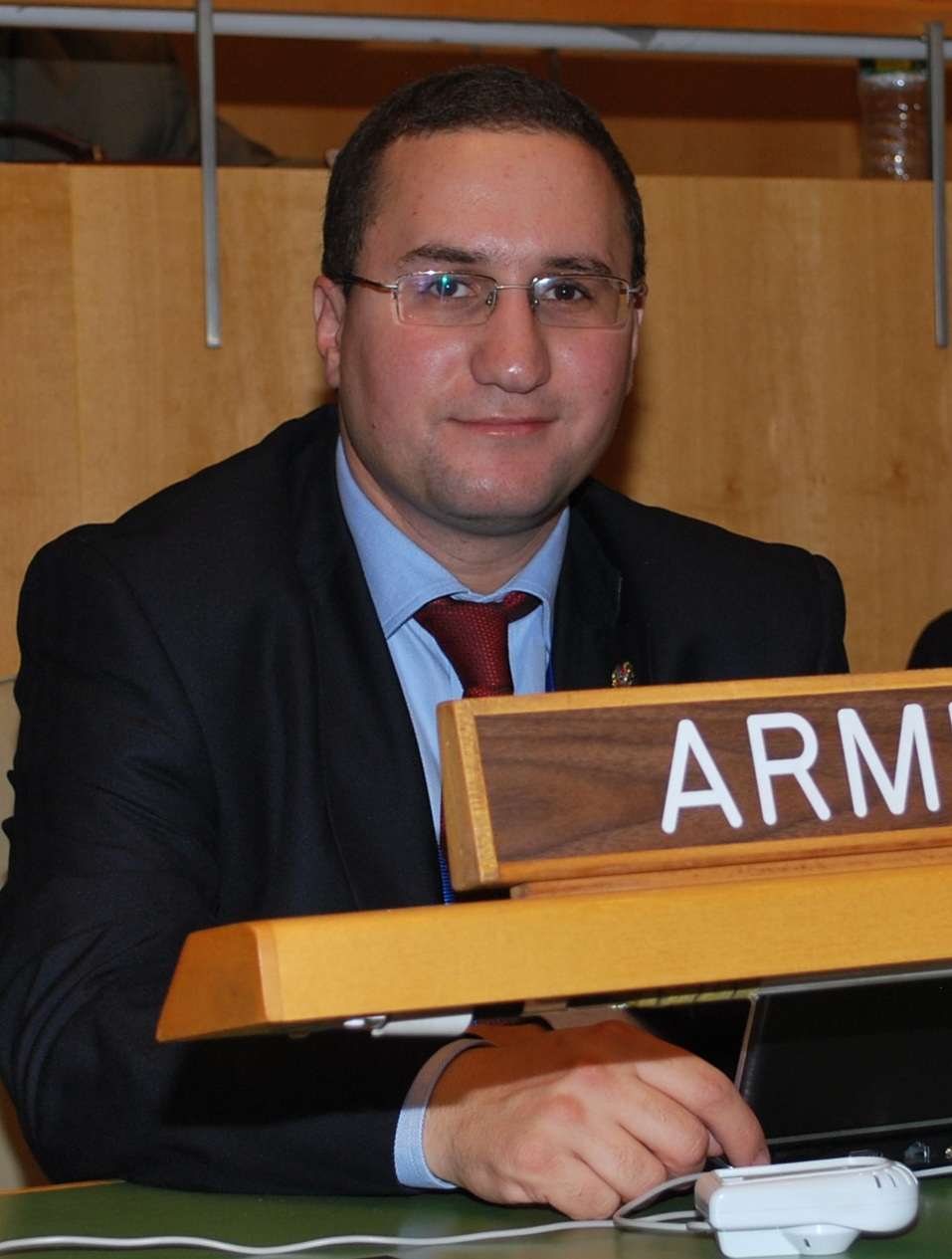
- Portrait of Tigran Balayan

Ambassador of Armenia to the Kingdom of the Netherlands, Permanent Representative of the Republic of Armenia to the OPCW
- In office October 2018 – present
- President: Armen Sarkissian
- Prime Minister: Nikol Pashinyan
- Preceded by: Garegin Melkonyan

Press Secretary of the Ministry of Foreign Affairs of Armenia
- In office June 2010 – present
- Preceded by: Vladimir Karapetyan

Personal details
- Born: October 29, 1977 (age 48) Yerevan, Armenian SSR, USSR
- Profession: Diplomat and historian

Tigran Balayan (Armenian: Տիգրան Բալայան; born October 29, 1977, in Yerevan, Armenian SSR) is an Armenian diplomat and historian. He served as the ambassador of Armenia to the Kingdom of the Netherlands and Permanent Representative of the Republic of Armenia to the OPCW. As of September 2023, Balayan serves as the head of the Mission of Armenia to the European Union and the ambassador of Armenia to Belgium.

== Career timeline ==
- 1994–1999 - Student in the International Relations department of the YSU with a degree in history and international relations.
- 1999–2002 - PhD student in the International Relations department of the YSU. PhD in History (2002). The topic of the dissertation was "Nagorno-Karabakh issue and the international diplomacy in 1991–1994".
- 2000–2002 - Student in the International Relations department of the diplomatic academy of the MFA of the Russian Federation.
- 1997–2000 - Assistant of the permanent representative of the NKR in Armenia, responsible for the public relations.
- 2000–2002 - Assistant of the head of the Political department in the Embassy of Armenia in Russia.
- 2002–2004 - Lecturer in the Russian-Armenian (Slavonic) University.
- 2002–2003 - Attaché in the department of the Information and Public Relations of the MFA of the Republic of Armenia.
- 2003–2004 - Attaché in the NATO division of the Arms Control and International Security Department of the MFA.
- 2004–2007 - Third, later Second Secretary in the Embassy of Armenia in the Kingdom of Belgium.
- 2007–2008 - Acting head of the Media Relations division of the Press and Information department of the MFA.
- 2007–2018 - Lecturer in the YSU International Relations department, since 2013 has the academic rank of associate professor.
- 2008–2010 - Acting spokesperson, as well as acting head of Press and Information department of the MFA.
- 2010–2018 - Spokesperson of the MFA.
- 2016–2018 - Acting head of information and public diplomacy Department of the MFA.
- 2018–2023 - Ambassador of Armenia to The Netherlands.
- 2020–present - Ambassador of Armenia to Luxembourg.
- 2023–present - Ambassador of Armenia to the European Union and Belgium.

Balayan is also the author of multiple scientific articles, as well as the monograph entitled "Nagorno-Karabakh issue and international diplomacy in 1991–1994", as well as collection of lectures on "Multilateral Diplomacy" and "Information support of Foreign Policy".

== Awards ==
- By the Decree of the president of Armenia as of 2 March 2015 has been awarded with the Diplomatic Rank of Envoy Extraordinary and Minister Plenipotentiary of the Republic of Armenia.
- Recipient of Ministry of Foreign Affairs Medal named after John Kirakossian for effective and successful performance of official duties (25 December 2015).
- Recipient of the Presidential medal of "Mkhitar Gosh" (1 March 2016).

== Private life ==
He is currently married, with a son and a daughter. His father, Kim Balayan is a member of the Constitutional Court of Armenia. In addition to his native Armenian, he is fluent in Russian, English, and French.

== See also ==
- Armenia–European Union relations
