= Antwerpsche Diamantkring =

Coordinates: 51.215844°N 4.418493°E

Antwerpsche Diamantkring building

The Antwerpsche Diamantkring was established in 1928 in Antwerp, Belgium, to become the first diamond bourse worldwide that is dedicated exclusively to rough diamonds trade.

It is a member of the World Federation of Diamond Bourses.

85% of the world's diamond supply is traded in Antwerp, and in particular in the Antwerpsche Diamantkring.

== Presidents of the Board of Directors ==
- 1929-1957 Gustave Garitte
- 1957-1961 Frans Beukelaar
- 1961-1972 Israel Beck
- 1973-1979 Michel Fraenkel
- 1979-1987 Sammy Hutterer
- 1987-1999 Isi Beck
- 1999-2003 Gerson Goldschmidt
- 2003-2012 David Wahl
- 2012- Alfred (Freddy) Inzlicht

== Rough Diamond Day ==
The Rough Diamond Day is a biannual international event dedicated to rough diamonds trade, organized by the Antwerpsche Diamantkring.
