= Antwerp World Diamond Centre =

Dutch corporation

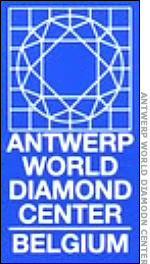
- Headquarters: Antwerp, Belgium
- Key people: Ari Epstein (CEO; till April 11, 2024)
- Website: awdc.be

The Antwerp World Diamond Centre (AWDC) is a public/private corporation, officially representing and coordinating the Antwerp diamond sector. It is located in the heart of Antwerp in the Hoveniersstraat. The chief executive officer of AWDC was Ari Epstein. He resigned in April 2024. The Diamond office facilitates the import and export of diamonds in and out of Antwerp. This is primarily done through marketing campaigns, services, conferences, trade fairs, economics missions, and various other ways. The World Diamond Center is home to all of the major diamond mining companies, which discover diamonds for over 1,800 individual diamond dealers across the globe. Other groups that aid in development, protection, and processing of these diamonds include diamond banks, insurance brokers, forwarders, best polishers, and researchers. It is acknowledged as the diamond capital of the world.

== History ==
In October 1973, the AWDC was established as the Hoge Raad voor Diamant (HRD), or Diamond High Council, by the Belgian government and diamond industry representatives. Their mission was to protect and promote the diamond sector in Belgium. It also had a commercial branch to issue certificates. In 2007, the Diamond High Council was restructured and split up in two different enterprises. One of them, the Antwerp World Diamond Centre (AWDC), a private foundation, is responsible for the representation of the collective interests of the Belgian diamond industry domestically and abroad. It also promotes Antwerp as the global capital of the diamond industry. The second, HRD Antwerp, a completely independent subsidiary of AWDC, is a commercial organization with six different branches: Diamond Lab, Precious Stones Lab, Research, Education, Graduates Club and Equipment.

== The Diamond Office ==
The Diamond Office is a government authorized service providing body, established in 1945, enabling the post-war diamond industry to quickly pick up again. The Diamond Office uses a unique model for import and export procedures: one-stop import & export clearing.

== See also ==
- 2003 Antwerp diamond heist
