= Terraced house =

Form of medium-density housing

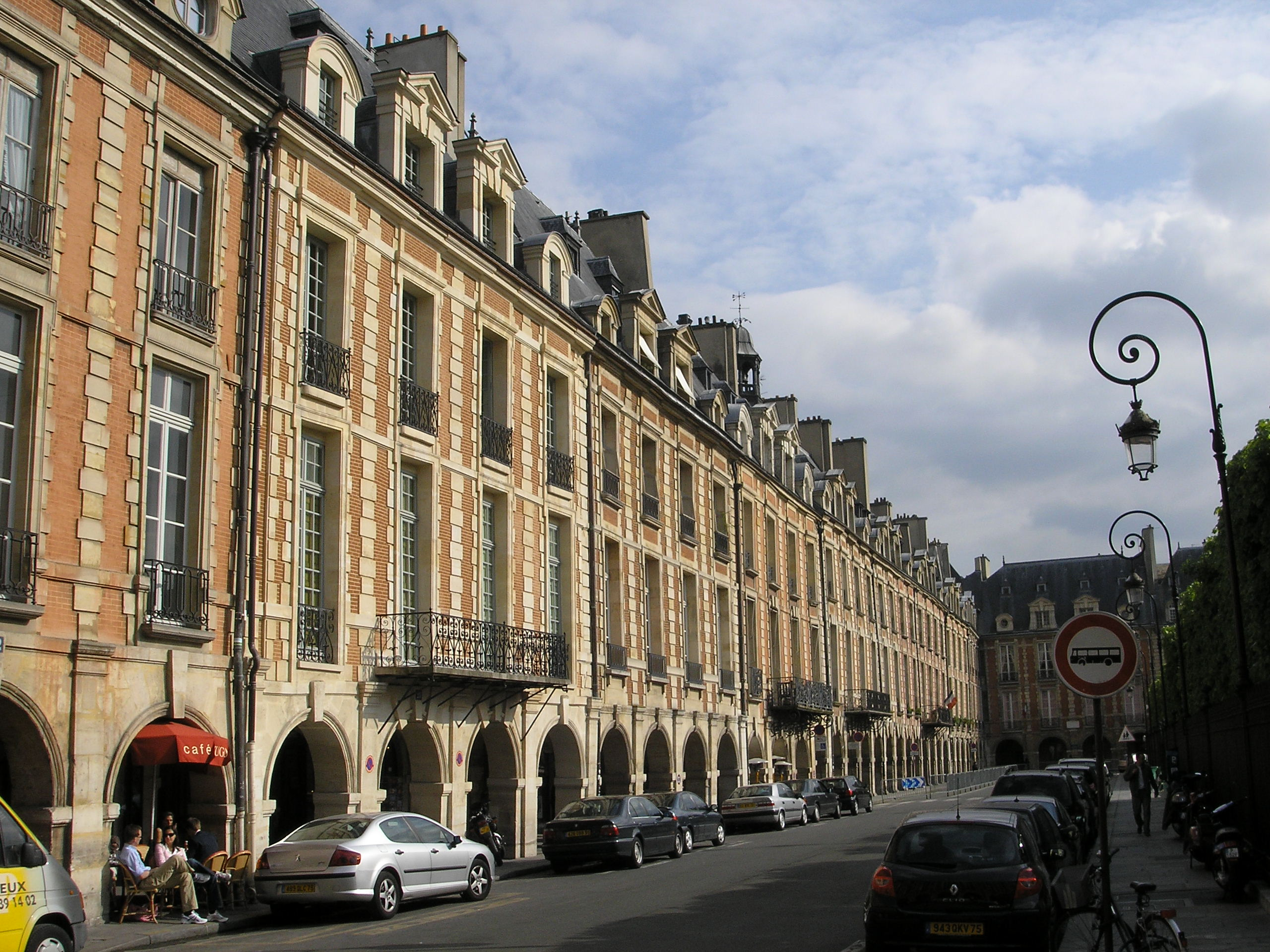
East side of the Place des Vosges in Paris, one of the earliest examples of terraced housing

A terrace or terraced house (UK) or townhouse (US) (Note: "Townhouse" can also refer to patio homes.) is a type of medium-density housing which first started in 16th century Europe with a row of joined houses sharing side walls. In the United States and Canada these are sometimes known as row houses or row homes.

Terrace housing can be found worldwide, though it is quite common in Europe and Latin America, and many examples can be found in the United Kingdom, Belgium, United States, Canada, and Australia. The Place des Vosges in Paris (1605–1612) is one of the early examples of the type. Although in early larger forms it was and still is used for housing the wealthy, as cities and the demands for ever smaller close housing grew, it regularly became associated with the working class. Terraced housing has increasingly become associated with gentrification in certain inner city areas, drawing the attention of city planning.

== Origins and nomenclature ==
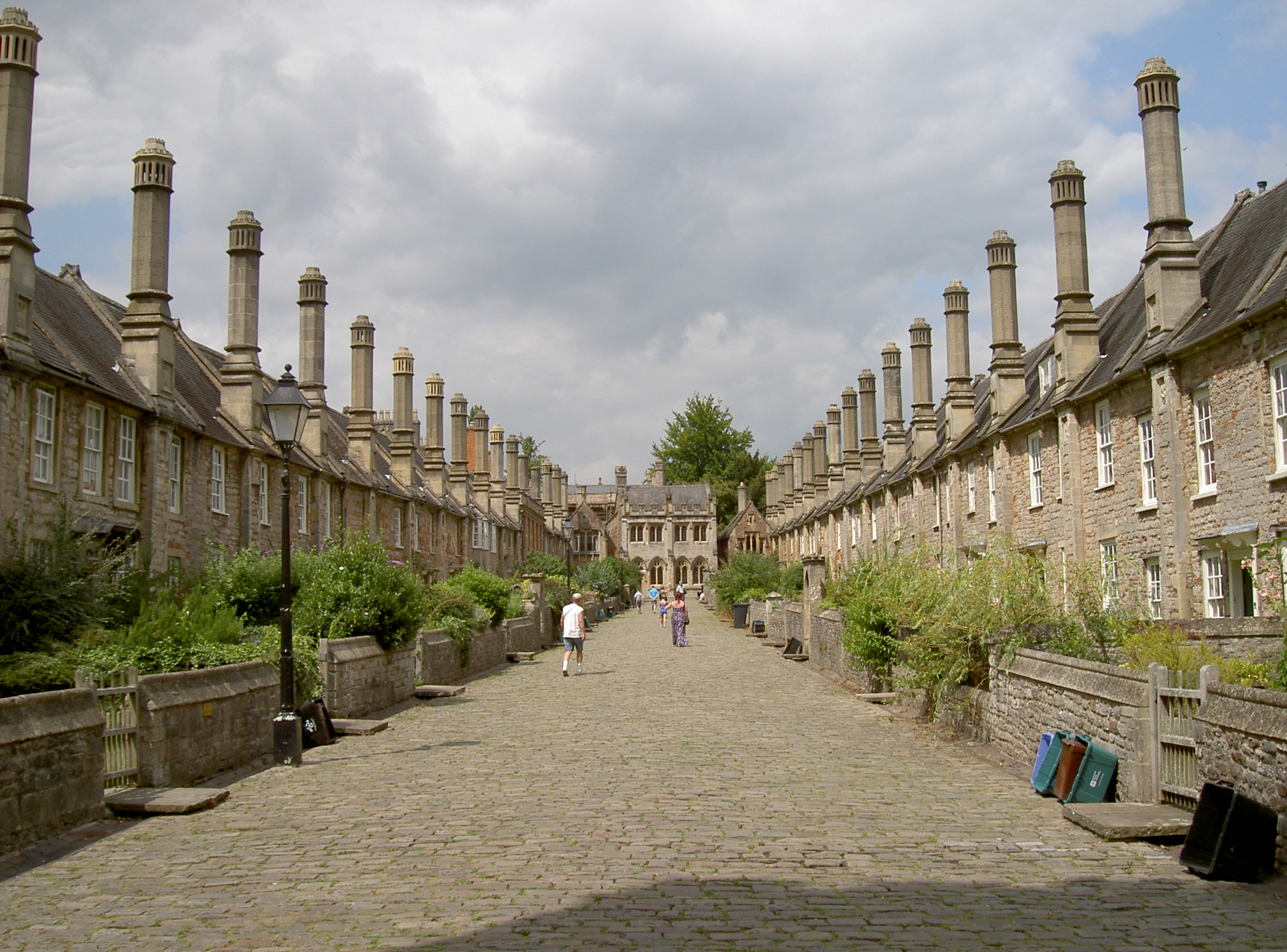
Vicars' Close, Wells, built 1348–1430

Though earlier Gothic examples, such as Vicars' Close, Wells, are known, the alignment of the house fronts with the property line really began in the 16th century following Dutch and Belgian models and became called "row" houses in English. For example, in "Yarmouth Rows", Great Yarmouth, Norfolk, the building fronts all were right on the property line.

The term terrace was borrowed from garden terraces by British architects of the late Georgian period to describe streets of houses whose uniform fronts and uniform height created a stylish ensemble rather than a mere "row" of similar homes. Townhouses (or townhomes) are generally two- to three-story structures that share a wall with a neighbouring unit. As opposed to apartment buildings, townhouses do not have neighbouring units above or below them. They are similar in concept to row houses or terraced houses, but share a common design and construction. The first and last of the houses is called an end terrace and is often a different layout from the houses in the middle, sometimes called mid-terrace.

== Oceania ==
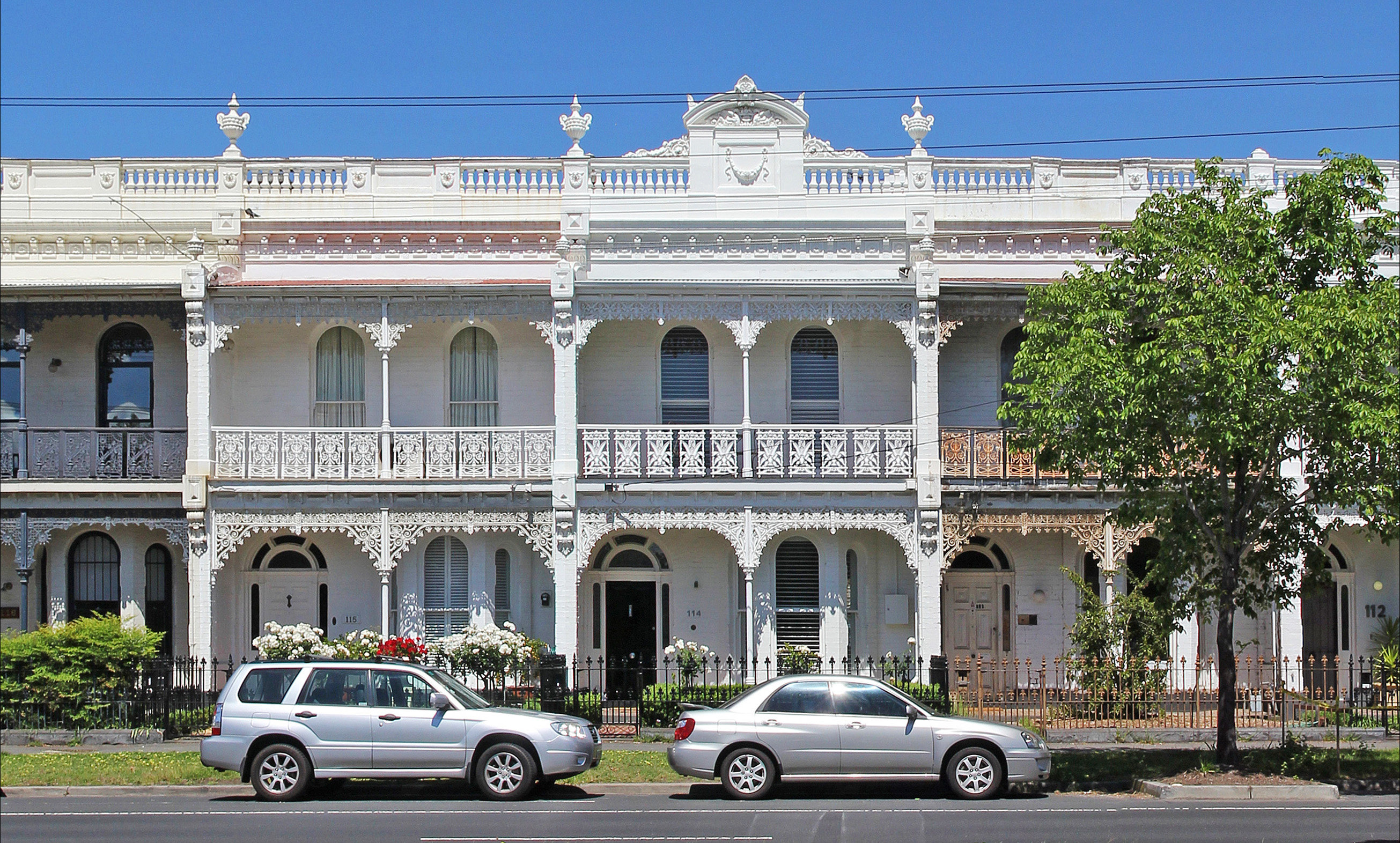
Rows of terraced houses at 112-116 Canterbury Road Middle Park, Melbourne

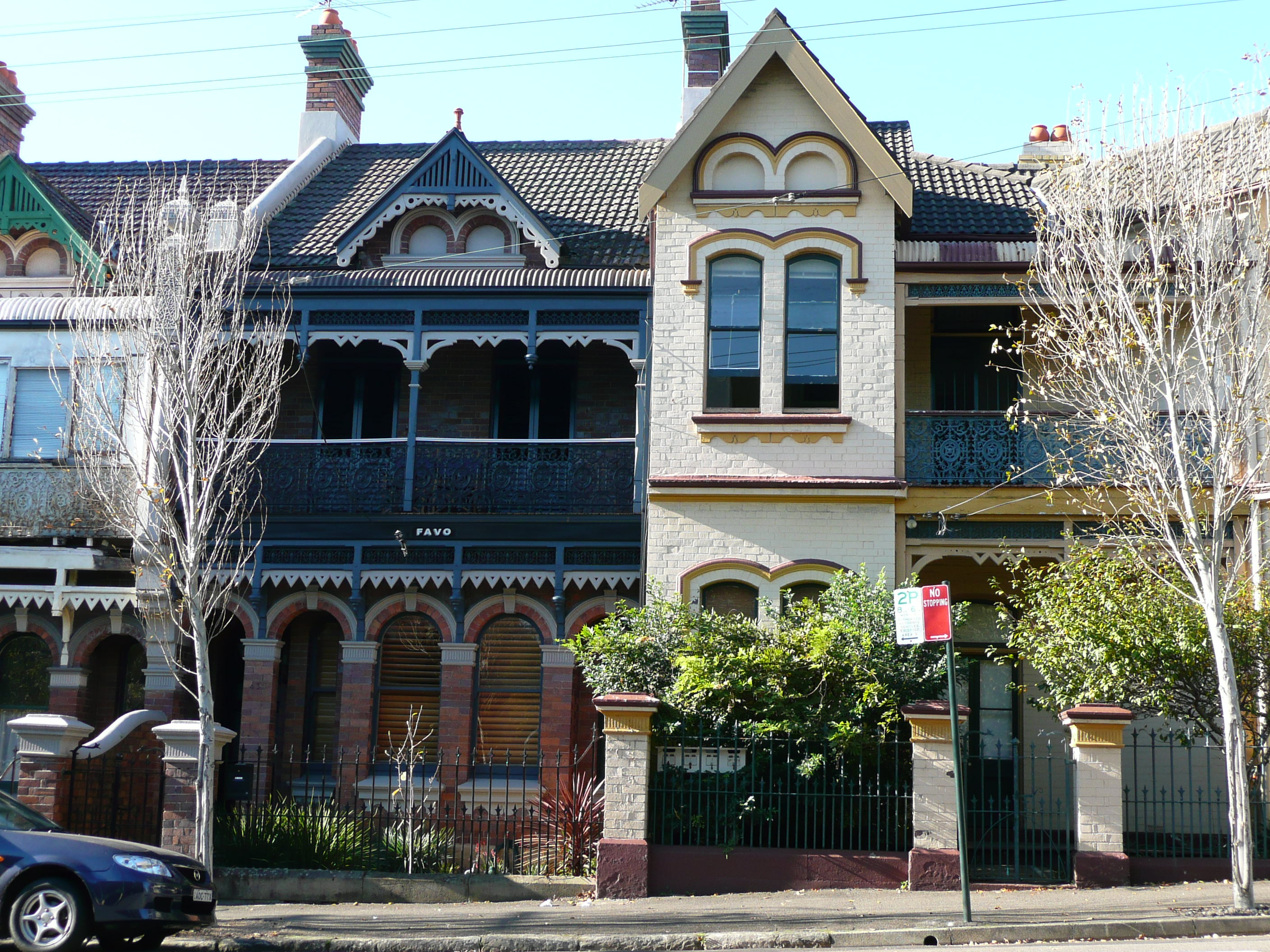
Terraced housing at 435 Glebe Point Road, Glebe, Sydney

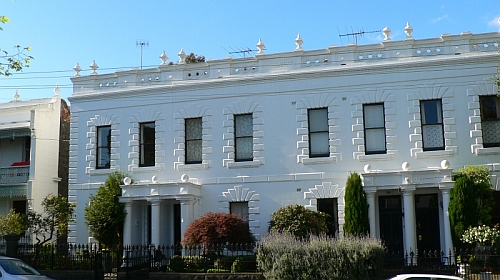
Cypress Terrace, 158-164 Hotham Street, East Melbourne, an example of well-preserved terraces

In Australia, the term "terrace house" refers almost exclusively to Victorian and Edwardian era terraces or replicas almost always found in the older, inner city areas of the major cities. Terraced housing was introduced to Australia from Britain in the nineteenth century, basing their architecture on those in the UK, France and Italy.

Large numbers of terraced houses were built in the inner suburbs of large Australian cities, particularly Sydney and Melbourne, mainly between the 1850s and the 1890s (terraced housing is rare outside of these cities). Detached housing became the popular style of housing in Australia following Federation in 1901. The most common building material used was brick, often covered with cement render and then painted.

Many terraces were built in the "filigree" style, a style distinguished through heavy use of cast iron ornament, particularly on the balconies and sometimes depicting native Australian flora. In the 1950s, many urban renewal programmes were aimed at eradicating them entirely in favour of modern development.

In recent decades these inner-city areas and their terraced houses have been gentrified. The suburbs in which terrace houses are often found are often sought after in Australia due to their proximity to the Central Business Districts of the major cities. They are therefore sometimes quite expensive even though they may not be the preferred accommodation style. The lack of windows on the side, the small gardens, and the relative darkness of the rooms is at odds with the design favoured for modern Australian homes.

== Europe ==
=== Belgium ===
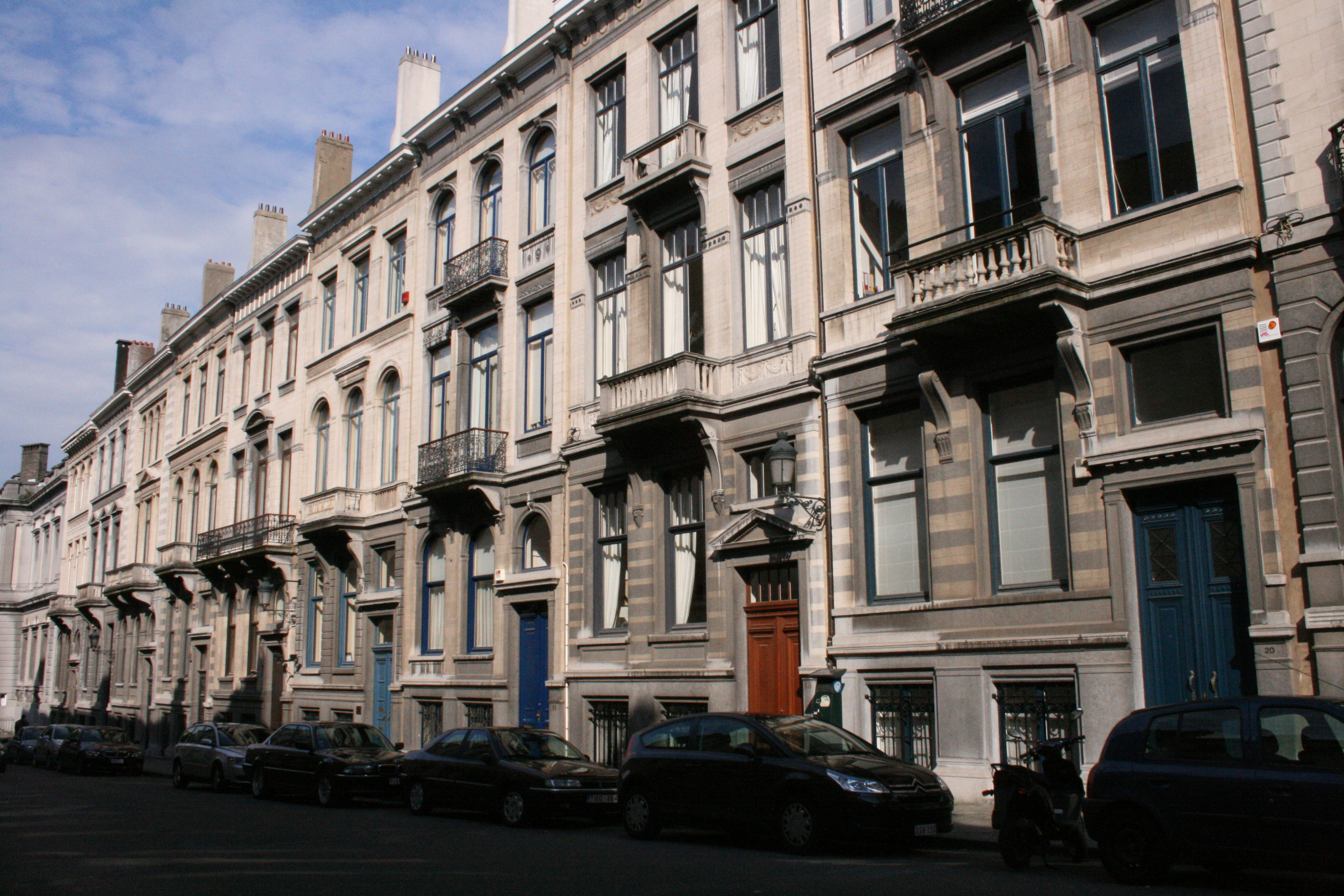
Rue aux Laines/Wolstraat, a typical street in Brussels with a homogeneous series of bourgeois row houses

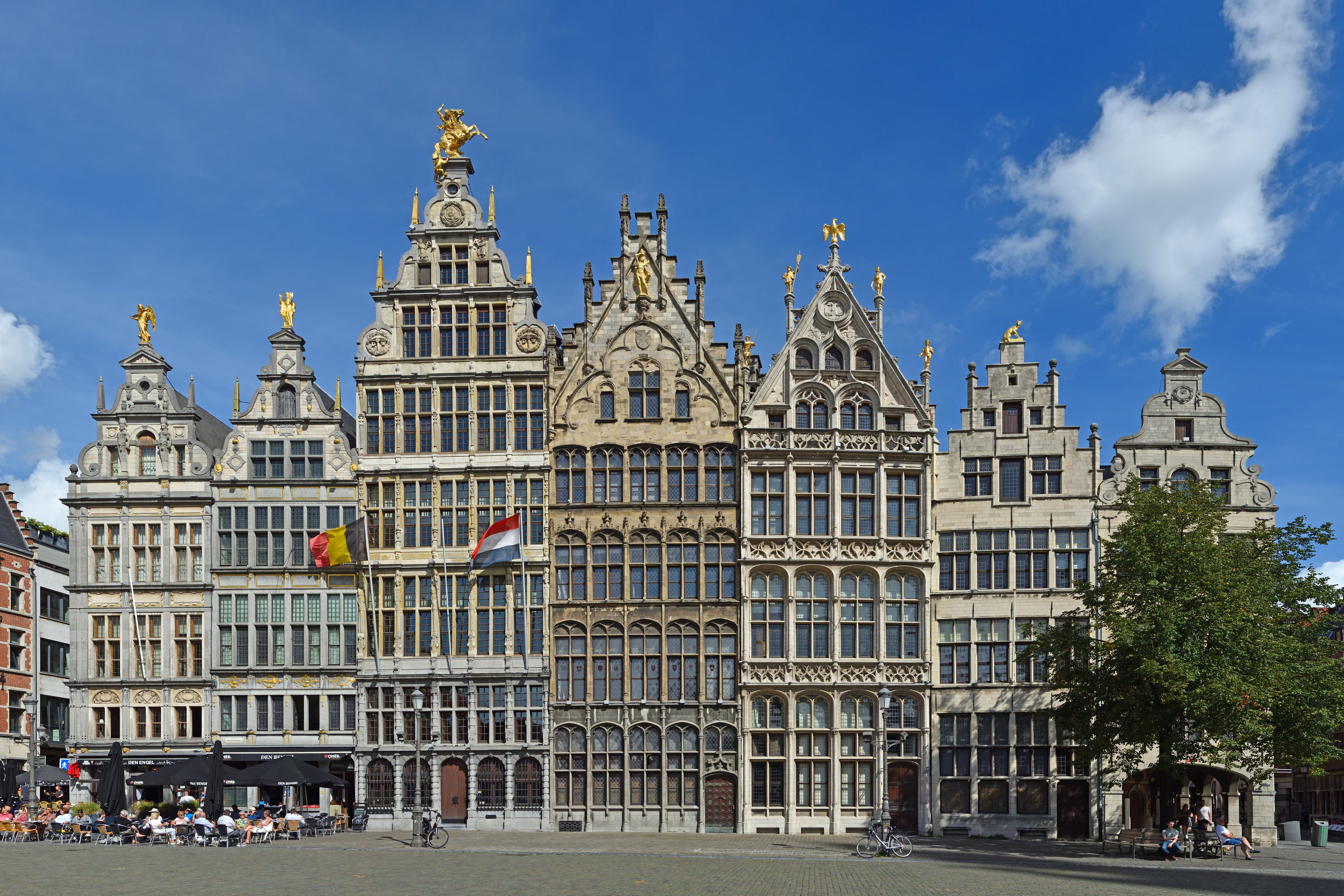
The guildhalls on the north side of the Grote Markt (main square) in Antwerp, representing the different corporations

In Belgium, row houses are the predominant type of housing around the country and are closely associated with Belgian culture and history. The Grand-Place/Grote Markt, the central historic square of the capital Brussels, is surrounded by 17th-century guildhalls, reflecting the city's status as a mercantile power in Northwestern Europe at that time.

Later, in the 19th century, Belgium played an important role in the early Industrial Revolution, and a large amount of working class housing was built to accommodate the coal miners in small brick row houses usually called "coron". These types of constructions are very common in the coal mining and steelmaking regions of Wallonia, but also in the Nord-Pas-de-Calais region of France.

Within the same period (from 1850 to the early 1900s), major cities such as Brussels and Antwerp underwent significant urban development, with the construction of new neighborhoods as extensions of the cities, often entirely around individually owned plots where single-family row houses were built and occupied by both the middle class and the bourgeoisie. Some of these houses are internationally renowned for their architecture, such as the Art Nouveau-style Hôtel Tassel and Hôtel van Eetvelde, both designed by Victor Horta.

=== Finland ===
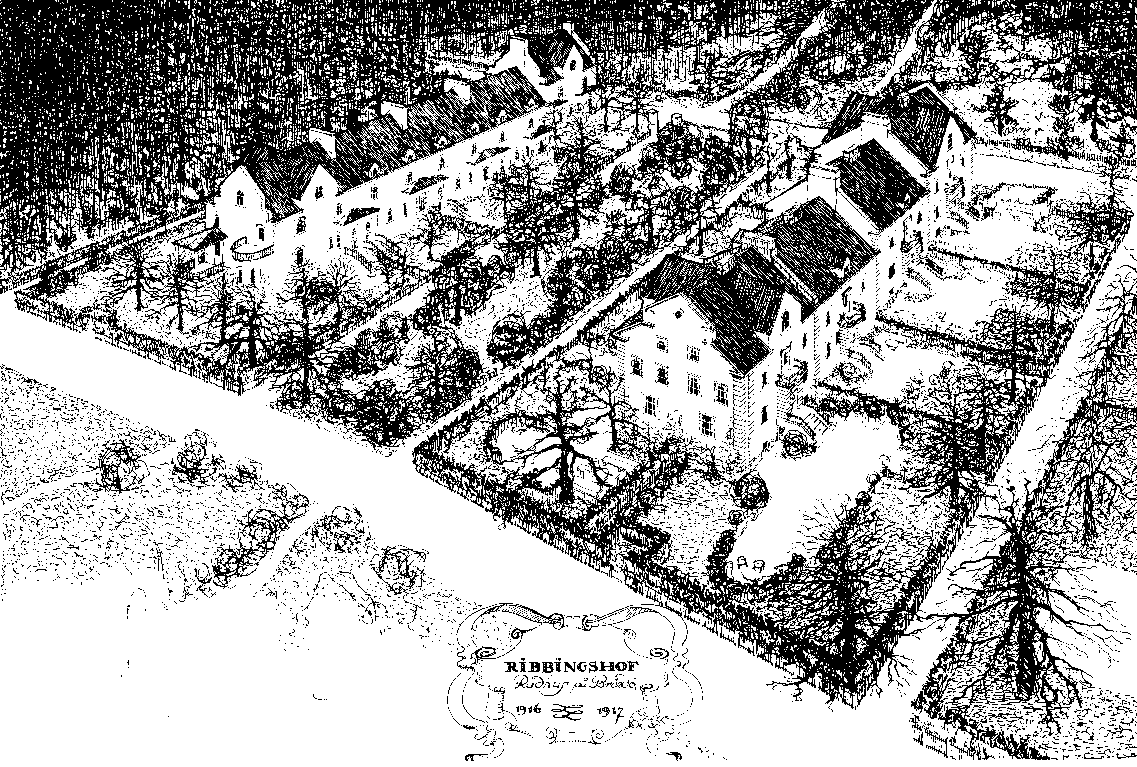
Ribbingshof (1916), Helsinki, the first "row houses" in Finland

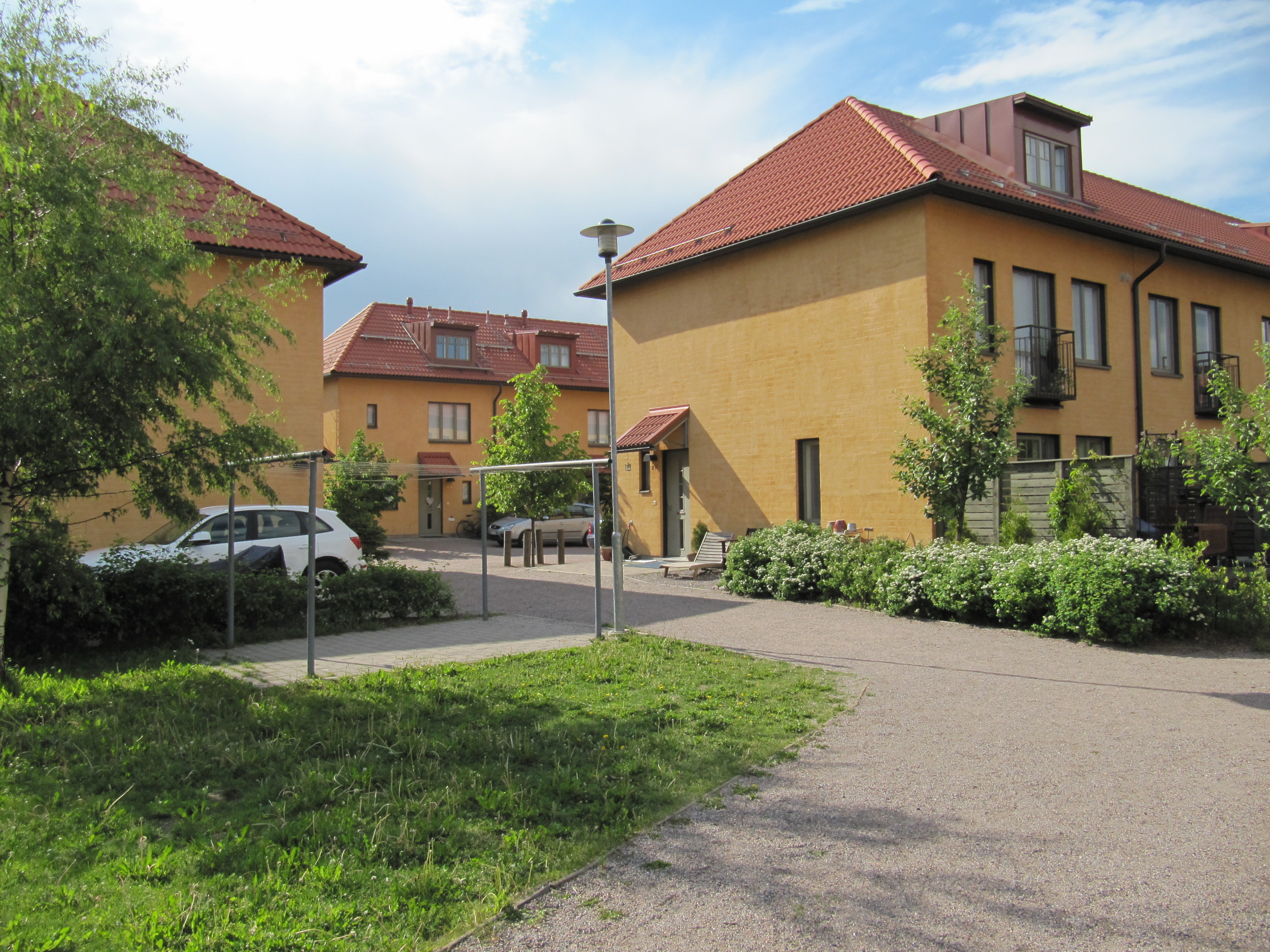
Row houses in Kartanonkoski, Vantaa, Finland (2011)

In Finland, an agrarian country where urbanism was a generally late phenomenon, the rivitalo (literally: row house) has not been seen as a particularly urban house type. What is regarded as the first terraced house to be built, Ribbingshof (1916), in the new Helsinki suburb of Kulosaari was designed by renowned architect Armas Lindgren, and was inspired by ideas from the English Garden City movement and Hampstead Garden Suburb, and was seen as a relatively low density residential area.

A similarly leafy suburban street of terraced houses was that of Hollantilaisentie (1920) in the suburb of Munkkiniemi, Helsinki, designed by architect Eliel Saarinen. They were initially envisioned as workers' housing, as part of a grand new urban scheme for the entirety of north-west Helsinki, but from the outset became a fashionable middle-class residential area. Later terraced housing in Finland is similarly associated with suburban middle-class living, such as the Tapiola garden city, Espoo, from the 1950s.

=== France ===
Terraced housing has long been a popular form in Paris, France. The Place des Vosges (1605–1612) was one of the earliest examples of the arrangement. In Parisian squares, central blocks were given discreet prominence, to relieve the façade. Terraced building including housing was also used primarily during Haussmann's renovation of Paris between 1852 and 1870 creating whole streetscapes consisting of terraced rows.

=== United Kingdom and Ireland ===
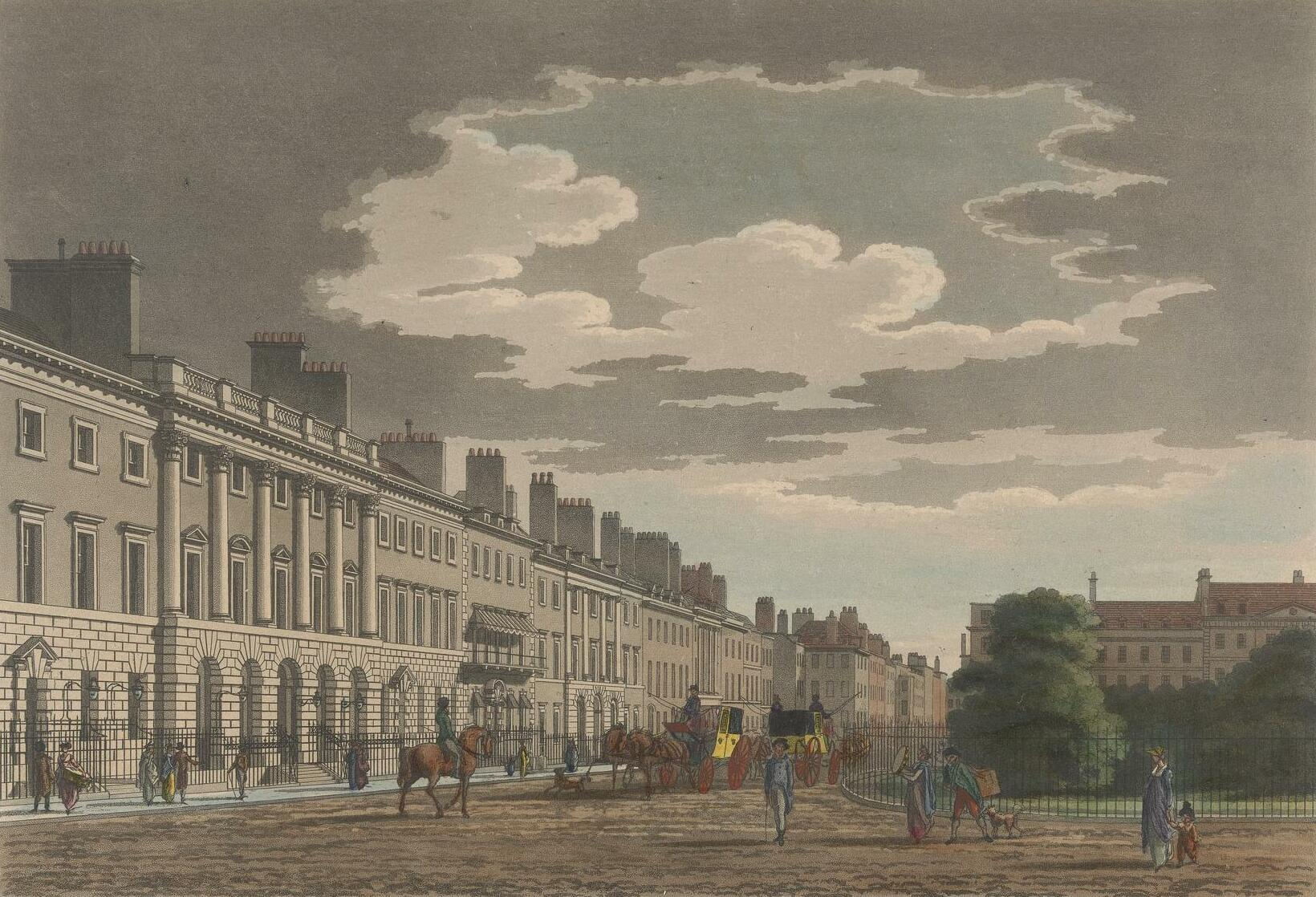
Grosvenor Square, one of the earliest terraces in Britain

The first streets of houses with uniform fronts were built by the Huguenot entrepreneur Nicholas Barbon in the rebuilding after the Great Fire of London. Fashionable terraces appeared in London's Grosvenor Square from 1727 onwards and in Bath's Queen Square from 1729 onwards. The Scottish architect Robert Adam is credited with the development of the house itself. Early terraces were also built by the two John Woods in Bath and under the direction of John Nash in Regent's Park, London. The term was picked up by speculative builders like Thomas Cubitt and soon became commonplace.

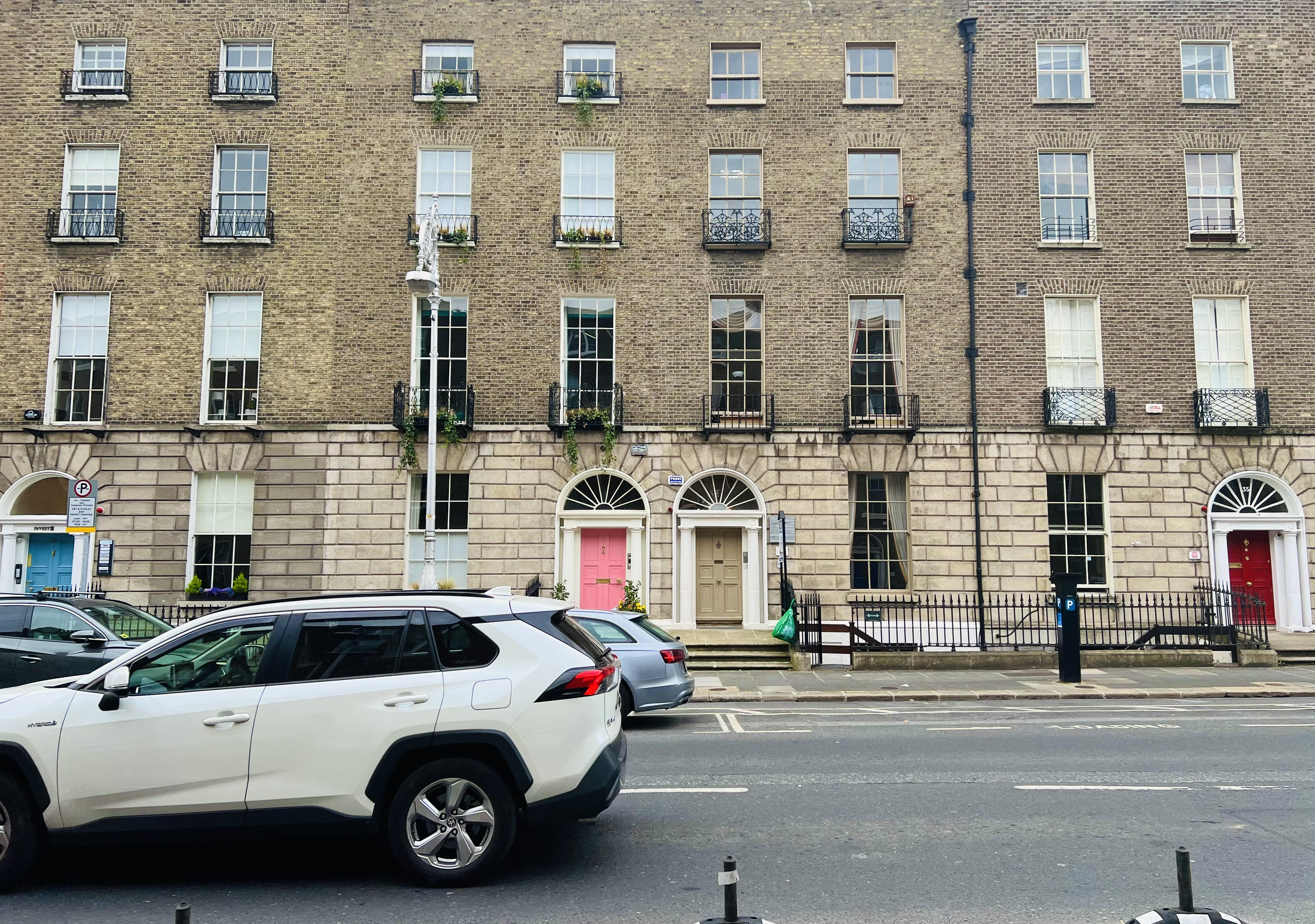
Upper class Georgian terraces along Dublin's Georgian mile

It is far from being the case that terraced houses were only built for people of limited means. This is especially true in London, where some of the wealthiest people in the country owned them in locations such as Belgrave Square and Carlton House Terrace. These townhouses, in the British sense, were the London residences of noble and gentry families who spent most of the year in their country houses. These terraced houses, often surrounding a garden square, are hallmarks of Georgian architecture. The same was true of many British and Irish cities. In Dublin, Georgian squares such as Merrion Square and Fitzwilliam Square housed the city's upper classes. A type of terraced house known latterly as the "one-floor-over-basement" was a style of terraced house particular to the Irish capital. They were built in the Victorian era for the city's lower middle class and emulated upper class townhouses.

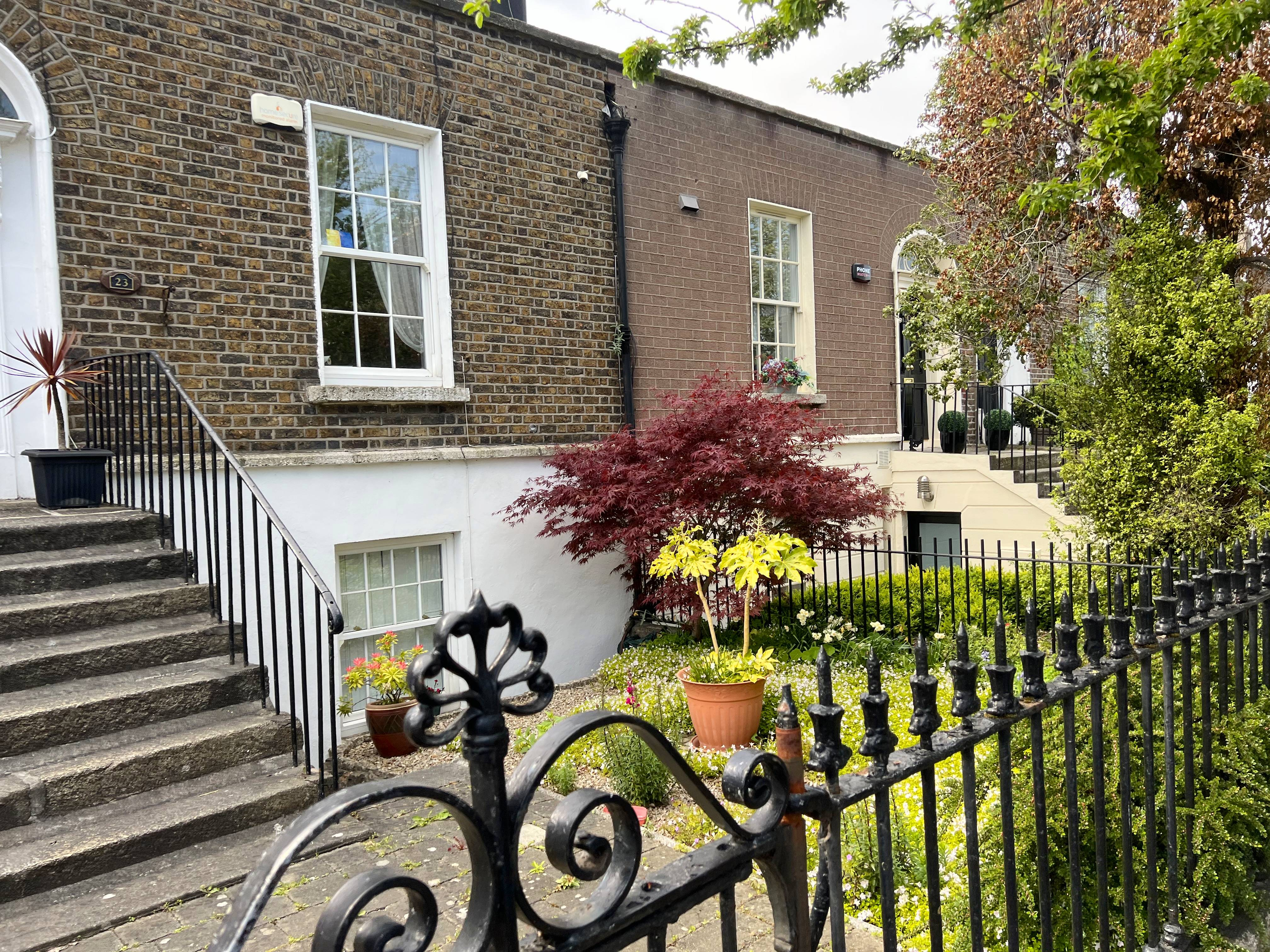
Single floor over basement terraced houses were unique to Dublin in the Victorian era.

By the early Victorian period, a terrace had come to designate any style of housing where individual houses repeating one design are joined into rows. The style was used for workers' housing in industrial districts during the rapid urbanisation following the Industrial Revolution, particularly in the houses built for workers of the expanding textile industry. The terrace style spread widely across the country, and was the usual form of high-density residential housing up to World War II. The 19th century need for expressive individuality inspired variation of façade details and floor-plans reversed with those of each neighbouring pair, to offer variety within the standardised format.

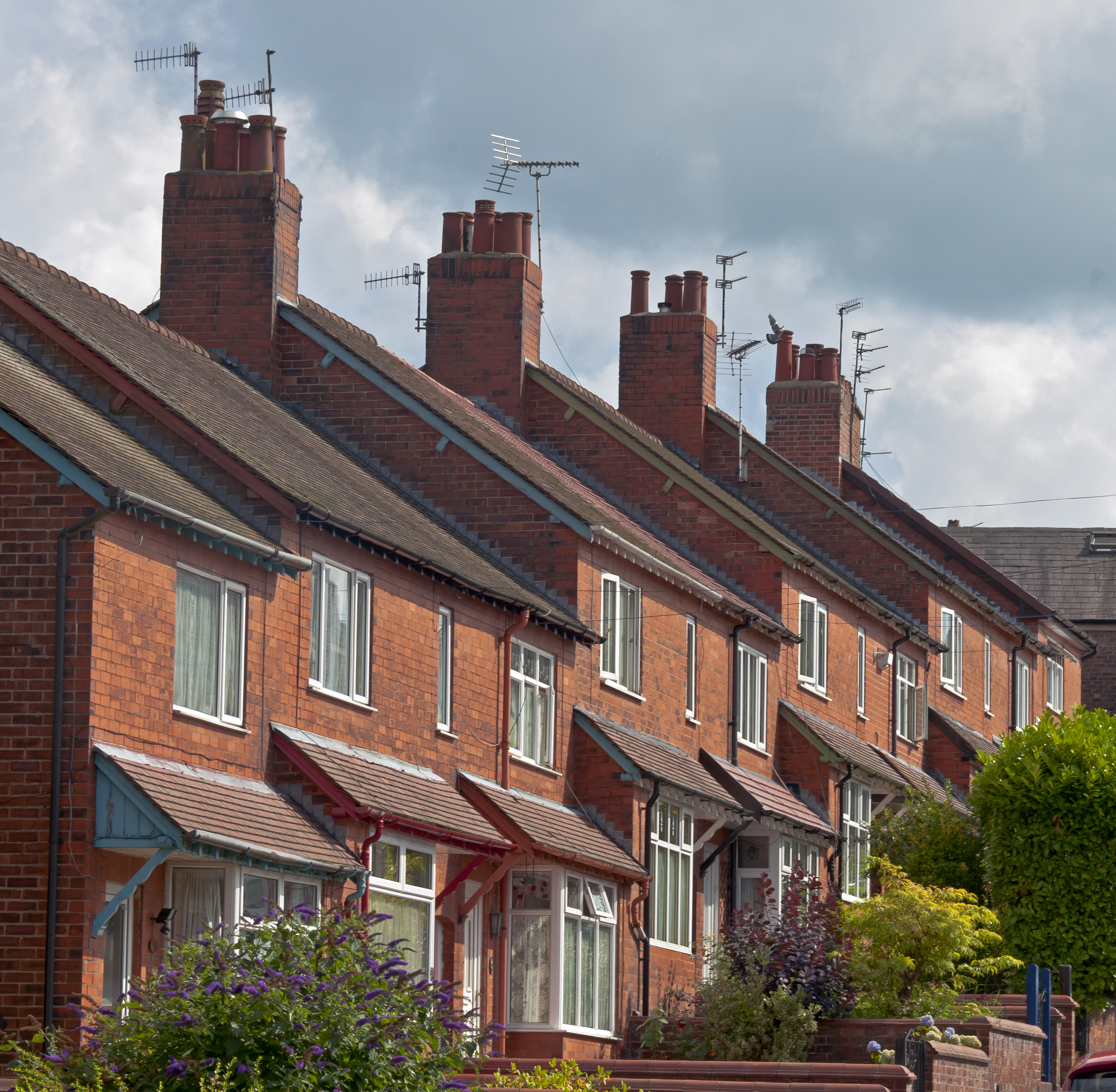
Terraced houses in Macclesfield

A major distinction is between through terraces, whose houses have both a front and a back door, and back-to-backs, which are bricked in on three sides. The 1875 Public Health Act imposed a duty on local authorities to regulate housing by the use of byelaws, and subsequently all byelaw terraced housing was required to have its own privy, with rear access to allow the night soil to be collected as per the Rochdale system. As recently as 2011, byelaw terraced houses made up over 15% of the United Kingdom's housing stock. Since the Second World War, housing redevelopment has led to many outdated or dilapidated terraces being cleared to make room for tower blocks, which occupy a much smaller area of land. Because of this land use in the inner city areas could in theory have been used to create greater accessibility, employment or recreational or leisure centres. However, sub-optimal or flawed implementation has meant that in many areas (like Manchester or the London estates) the tower blocks offered no real improvement for rehoused residents over their prior terraced houses.

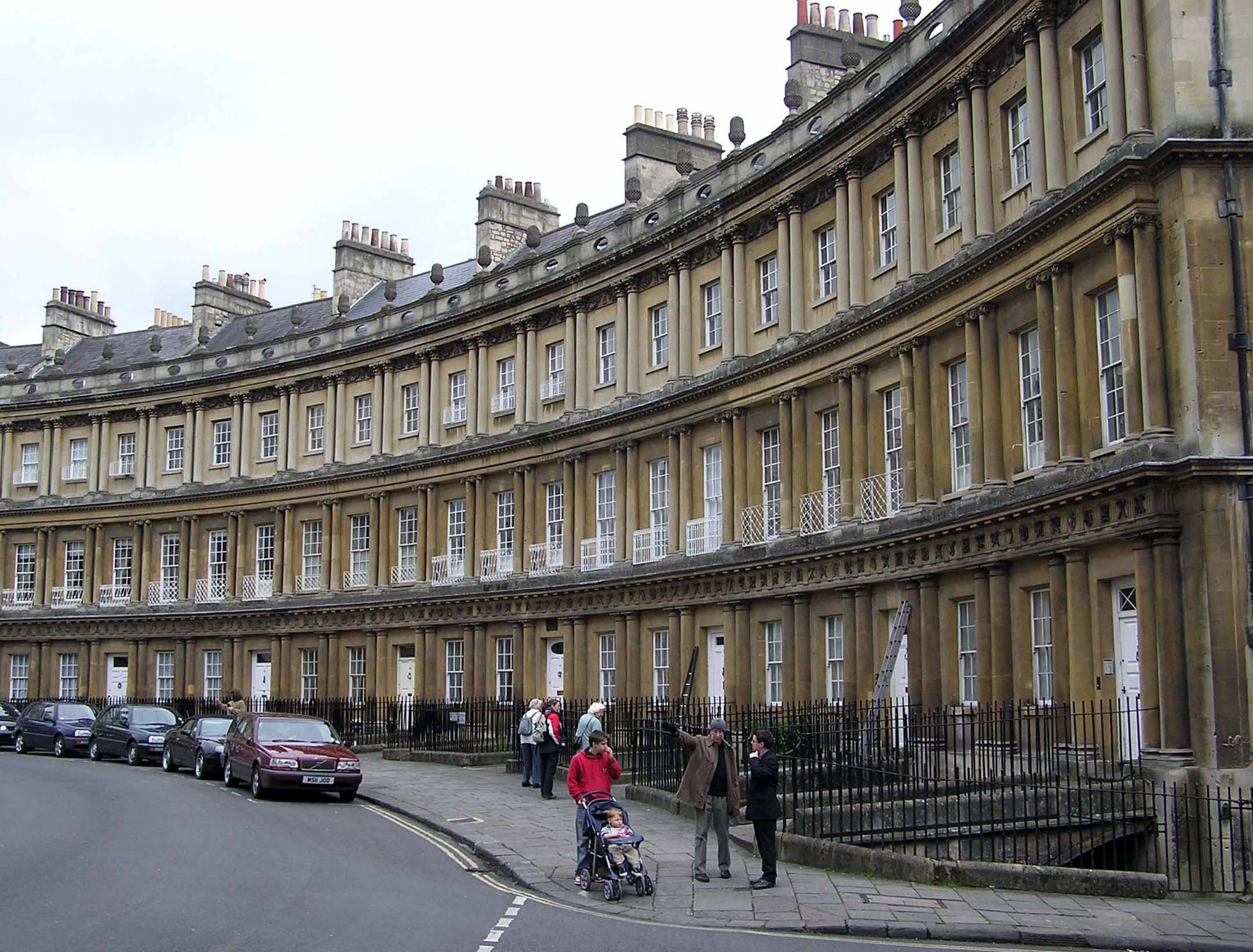
The Circus in Bath is one of many examples of terraced housing in that architecturally distinctive city.

In 2005 the English Heritage report Low Demand Housing and the Historic Environment found that repairing a standard Victorian terraced house over 30 years is around 60% cheaper than building and maintaining a newly built house. In a 2003 survey for Heritage Counts a team of experts contrasted a Victorian terrace with a house built after 1980, and found that:

The research demonstrated that, contrary to earlier thinking, older housing actually costs less to maintain and occupy over the long-term life of the dwelling than more modern housing. Largely due to the quality and life-span of the materials used, the Victorian terraced house proved almost £1,000 per 100 m^{2} cheaper to maintain and inhabit on average each year.

== North America ==
=== Canada ===
==== Halifax ====
Halifax's use of rowhouses, townhouses and terraced housing has been consistent throughout its history, particularly on the Peninsula where the city first began settlement. In the older sections of the city are sections of terraced housing used historically for military families, as part of established families' real estate holdings in addition to a country house, and as dwellings for the working classes of the city and as public housing. The most well-known of the terraced housing areas is The Hydrostone, which was originally built as replacement housing stock for those made homeless after the Halifax Explosion; individual owners have, however, altered the exteriors of many of the rowhouses over time to accommodate changing family needs. More recently, there have been rowhouse developments appearing in diverse areas throughout the city.

==== Montreal ====
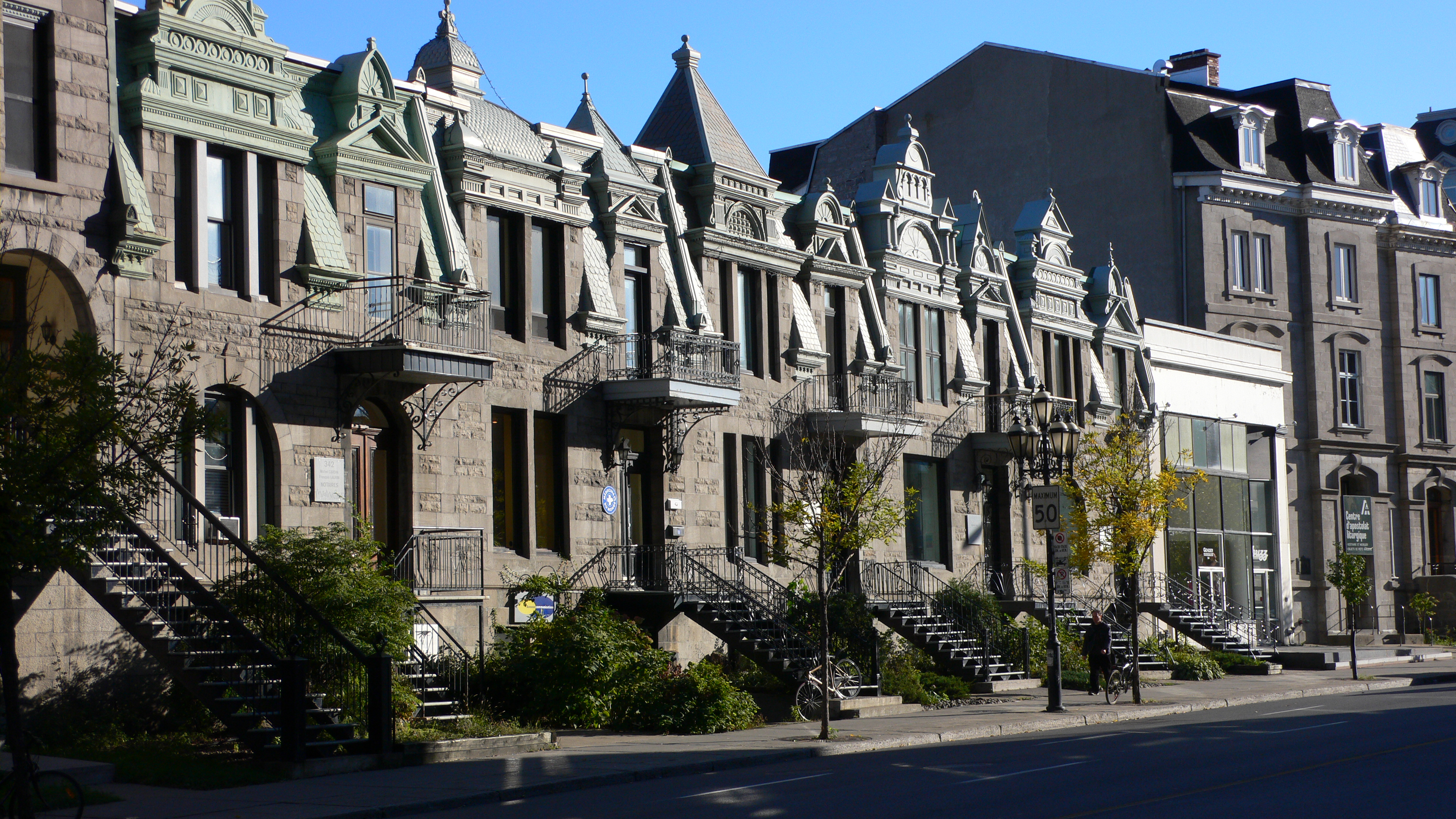
Row houses on Rue Sherbrooke in downtown Montreal

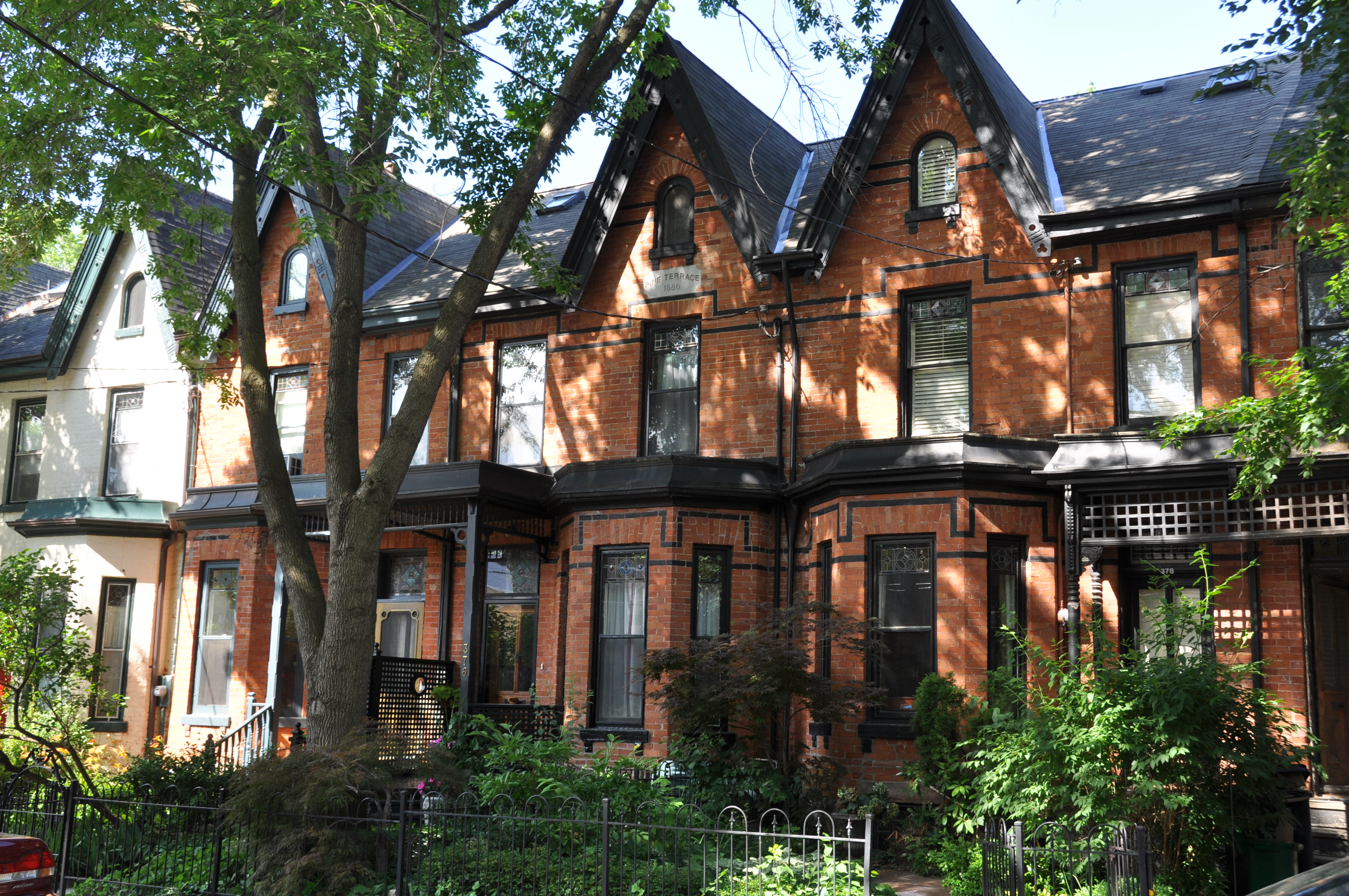
Terraced half bay-and-gable row houses, a Victorian residential style unique to Toronto, in Cabbagetown

Montreal has the largest stock of terraced houses in Canada and they are typical in all areas of the city. As is common in other North American cities, in Montreal row houses are often referred to as townhouses.

The streetscape of the city's 19th century neighbourhoods, such as the Plateau, Centre-Sud, and Hochelaga, are dominated by row houses, duplexes and triplexes. Row houses continued to be built throughout the 20th century. In many neighbourhoods, such as Villeray, Parc Extension, and Ville-Émard, they became the dominant form of housing during the post-war period.

In the 21st century, Montreal has continued to build row houses at a high rate, with 62% of housing starts in the metropolitan area being apartment or row units. Apartment complexes, high-rises, and semi-detached homes are less popular in Montreal when compared to large Canadian cities like Toronto or Vancouver but similar to some US cities, in particular Philadelphia. Montreal's characteristic row houses and their iconic alleyways, balconies, and outdoor staircases have become cultural symbols of the city, featured in David Fennario's Balconville and Mordecai Richler's The Apprenticeship of Duddy Kravitz.

==== Toronto ====
Terraced homes are abundant in Old Toronto. Many of them are constructed in the local bay-and-gable style, popular in the 1870s.

Examples of Victorian bay-and-gable style can be found in Cabbagetown, Toronto, Parkdale, The Annex, Kensington Market, areas east of Chinatown, Toronto and Spadina Avenue including Baldwin Village. The last surviving row of Georgian-style terraced houses in Toronto, known as Walnut Hall, was demolished in 2007 as a result of structural decay.

=== United States ===
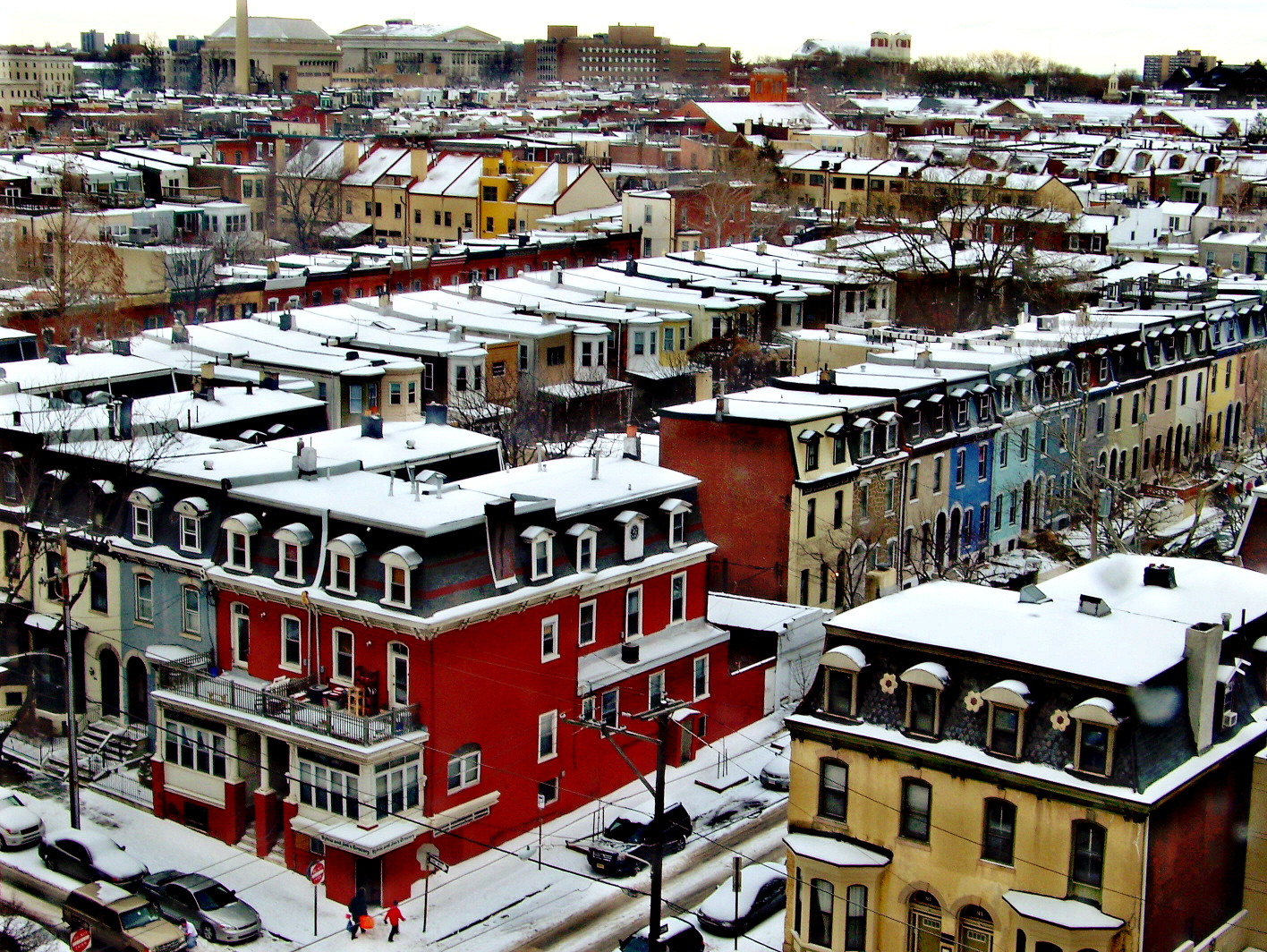
Row houses in Philadelphia's Art Museum area

According to the US Census Bureau, the highest concentration of terraced houses in the United States is in the Mid-Atlantic region, particularly the Philadelphia, Baltimore, and Washington metropolitan areas. The first terraced houses in the nation were Carstairs Row in Philadelphia, designed by builder and architect Thomas Carstairs c. 1799 through 1820, for developer William Sansom, as part of the first speculative housing developments in the United States. Carstairs Row was built on the southern part of the site occupied by "Morris's Folly" – Robert Morris's unfinished mansion designed by L'Enfant. Prior to this time houses had been built not in rows, but individually. It can be contrasted with Elfreth's Alley, the oldest continuously occupied road in the U.S., where all the houses are of varying heights and widths, with different street lines, doorways and brickwork.

Terraced housing in the United States is generally referred to as townhouses. In some cities such as New York, Philadelphia, Baltimore, Washington, D.C., and San Francisco, where they have been part of the landscape for over a century, they are often called row houses or row homes. Despite the narrow lots, many row houses are relatively large, some being over 2,000 square feet. They typically have two stories, but may have three or more (with the latter often being converted into apartments for separate tenants). The term "townhouse" in the Northeast and Mid-Atlantic usually refers to modern terraced houses constructed in the late 20th century and beyond, especially those in suburban settings, which often have home owners associations and include garages. Multi-story attached homes that are grouped in twos or threes are typically called duplexes (or twins) and triplexes respectively.

==== Baltimore ====
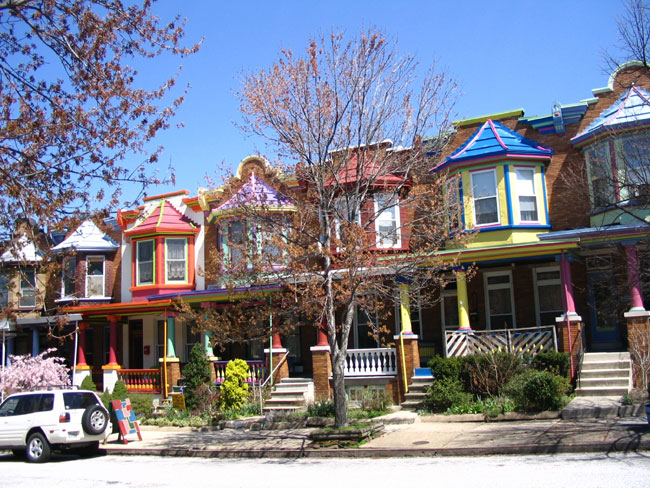
Row houses in Baltimore's Abell neighborhood

Most of Baltimore's housing consists of row houses. A few of Baltimore's row houses date back to colonial times. The style and materials used in their constructions vary throughout the city. A sizable quantity of Baltimore's row houses are clad with formstone, a distinct feature of Baltimore's row houses, typically found in working class and immigrant areas of the city. Marble front steps also make Baltimore's row houses distinct from other cities' row houses. Much like Philadelphia, some areas of the city that contain row houses are neglected. A significant number of Baltimore's row houses were built by the Czech-American real estate developer Frank Novak.

==== Boston ====
The row houses of Boston are found primarily in the Back Bay, Beacon Hill, and the South End. Back Bay is famous for its rows of Victorian brick townhouse homes – considered one of the best-preserved examples of 19th-century urban design in the United States. Beacon Hill is a neighborhood in Boston consisting of Federal-style rowhouses. The South End is built mostly of mid-nineteenth century bowfronts – aesthetically uniform rows of five-story, predominantly red-brick structures, of mixed residential and commercial uses.

==== Chicago ====
In Chicago, row houses can be found in the downtown and surrounding areas developed in the late 1800s through 1930s. Many are two and three-flat buildings (consisting of one or sometimes two apartments on a three-floored building). A greystone in Chicago is similar to the brownstone found in New York and Boston, except the façade is clad in Indiana limestone. Most row houses are separated by a gangway that leads under the common wall between the houses leading to the rear of the property (where sometimes a rear house or coach house exists) and alleyway. The vast majority of two and three flats do not share a common wall and are stand alone structures. However, many row houses similar to those found in Philadelphia, Baltimore, and Washington, D.C. do exist, largely on the near south and west sides, though not as common. One particular address, 2319 East 100th street in Jeffrey Manor, became in-famous and is still known by many Chicago citizens as "the townhouse", after the murder of eight student nurses in the night of July 14th, 1966. It´s part of six two-storey-flats in a row.

==== Savannah ====
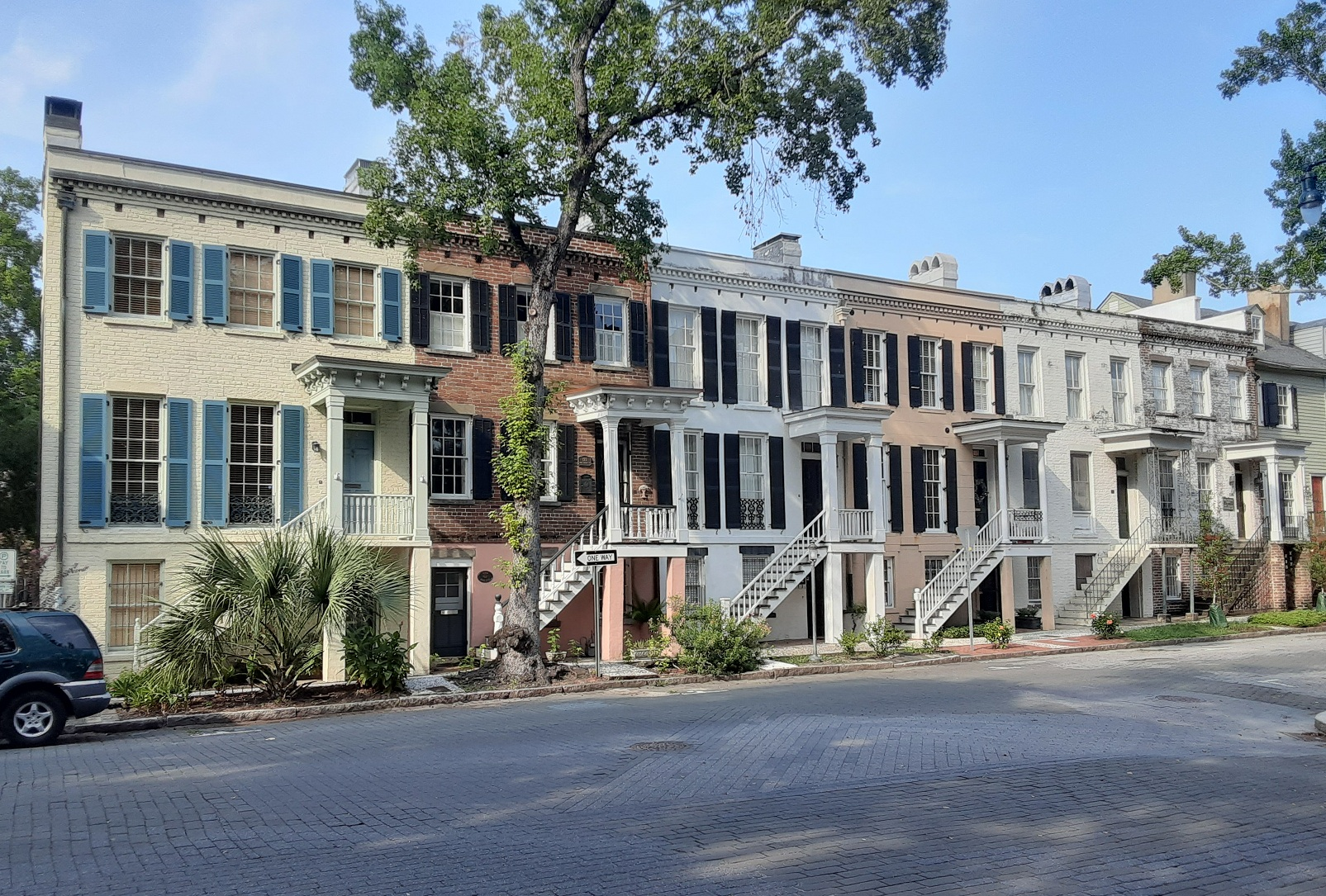
The Chatham Square Row in Savannah

Gordon Row, in Savannah, was built in the 1850s. It (and its individual carriage houses to the rear) is a contributing property of the Savannah Historic District, itself on the National Register of Historic Places, and fills an entire city block. After falling into disrepair, the buildings were renovated in the mid-20th century by the Historic Savannah Foundation. Other similar-style row houses exist in Savannah's Scudder's Row, William Remshart Row House, the Quantock Rows on Taylor Street and Jones Street, McDonough Row and Marshall Row.

==== New Orleans ====
New Orleans has a distinctive style of terrace house in the French Quarter known as the Creole townhouse that is part of what makes the city famous. The façade of the building sits on the property line, with an asymmetrical arrangement of arched openings. Creole Townhouses have a steeply pitched roof, side-gabled, with several roof dormers. The exterior is made of brick or stucco.

==== New York ====
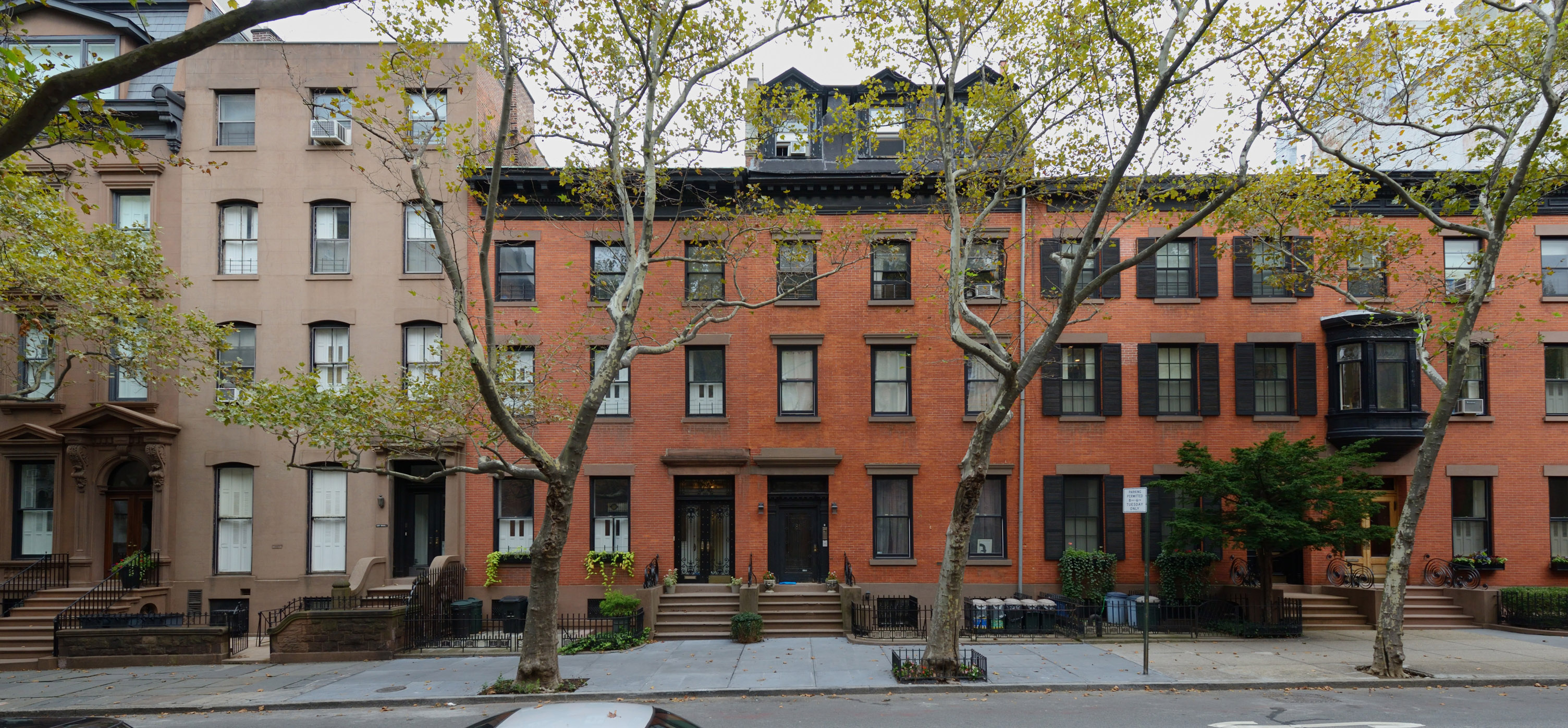
Townhouses in the Brooklyn Heights Historic District

The row houses of New York City are built with a variety of material, including brownstone, limestone, and brick, and some are wood-frame homes. Row houses are especially prominent in neighborhoods like Middle Village, Woodhaven and Jackson Heights in Queens; Bay Ridge, Bensonhurst, Brooklyn Heights, Bushwick, Canarsie, Marine Park, Park Slope, and Sunset Park in Brooklyn; and Williamsbridge, Wakefield, and Soundview in the Bronx.

==== Philadelphia ====
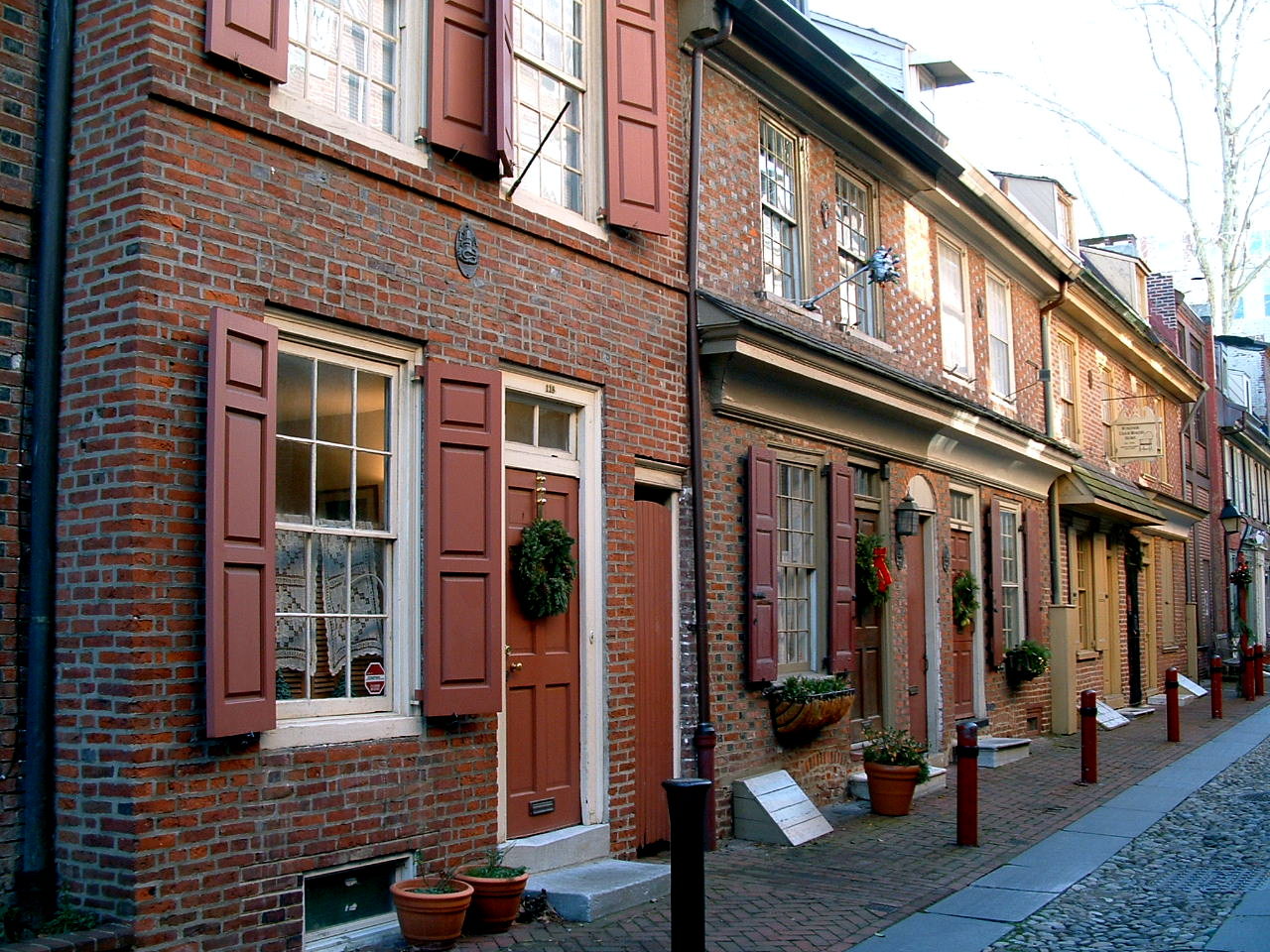
Historic homes on Elfreth's Alley, Philadelphia

In historic Philadelphia, the rowhouse (almost always spelled as one word) has been the most common domestic building type in the city and some of its suburbs since colonial times. Some of the oldest rowhouses in the city are narrow three-story "Trinity" houses that accommodated a large population of indentured servants and immigrant workers, in addition to enclaves of free African-Americans in the 19th century. Society Hill is known to have the largest concentration of original 18th- and early 19th-century residential architecture of any place in the United States. The style and type of material used in constructing Philadelphia's rowhouses vary throughout the city. Even in neighborhoods where twin houses are found, their façades and internal layouts usually resemble those of rowhouses.

Most are primarily red brick in construction, often with white stone trim. Some are faced with stone, being brownstone on some blocks in Center City, South Philadelphia, and North Philadelphia and being Wissahickon schist in Mayfair in Northeast Philadelphia and Mt. Airy in Northwest Philadelphia. West Philadelphia has many colorful rowhouses in the Italianate and Queen Anne architectural styles. As rowhouses are very common, the Philadelphia City Planning Commission (PCPC) publishes a specific guide for rowhouse home owners in an effort to detail some of the ways to maintain their properties.

With space within the city's borders at a premium, there has been a push to add a third floor to an existing rowhouse's in recent times, often this third level would include a rooftop deck. While zoning codes do exist which can possibly prevent third stories from being added to homes, Philly Mag claims "The city’s 2012 zoning code overhaul, which increased the height limit for rowhouses from 35 to 38 feet, has made this option increasingly prevalent."

==== San Francisco ====
San Francisco is also known for its terraced houses in the older neighborhoods of North Beach, the Castro, the Haight-Ashbury, Russian Hill, the Mission District, Duboce Triangle and the Western Addition. The "Painted Ladies" on Steiner Street, in the Western Addition's Alamo Square district, although not true "terraced", are a symbol of the city. Some ornate, intricately detailed Victorian-style homes labelled as "painted ladies" around the city are terraced, but most again are semi-detached and not true "terraced".

==== Washington, D.C. ====
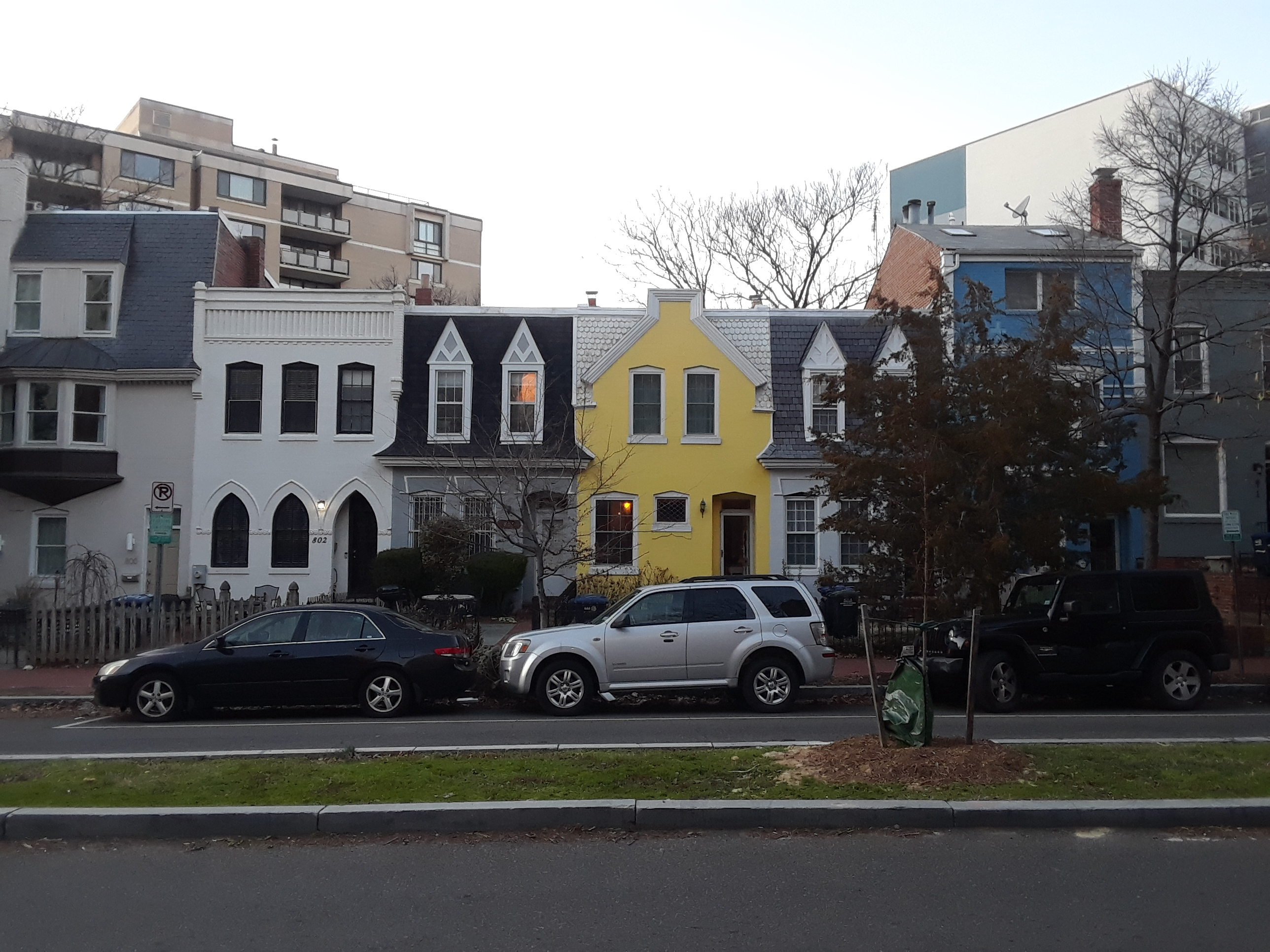
Historic rowhouses in Foggy Bottom, Washington, D.C.

Several neighborhoods in Washington, D.C. feature rowhouses, often composing the majority or a large plurality of the local housing stock. As in other American cities, rowhouses in D.C. span a wide range of architectural styles and building materials. Neighborhoods known for high concentrations of rowhouses include Capitol Hill, Dupont Circle, Logan Circle, Shaw, LeDroit Park, Columbia Heights, Petworth, and Bloomingdale. Many neighborhoods with rowhouses are located in the city's Northwest quadrant, in the densely populated area east of Rock Creek Park, except for Capitol Hill and its sub-neighborhoods, which occupy the areas of the Northeast and Southeast quadrants directly east of the United States Capitol Building. Because many D.C. rowhouses are historic structures, dating back as far as the early 1800s, they are especially common within the city's original boundaries, as laid out in the 1791 L'Enfant Plan. Outside of Washington DC many townhomes have been built in the last 50 years to encourage density especially around Metro stations and other areas of interest.

==== Other cities ====
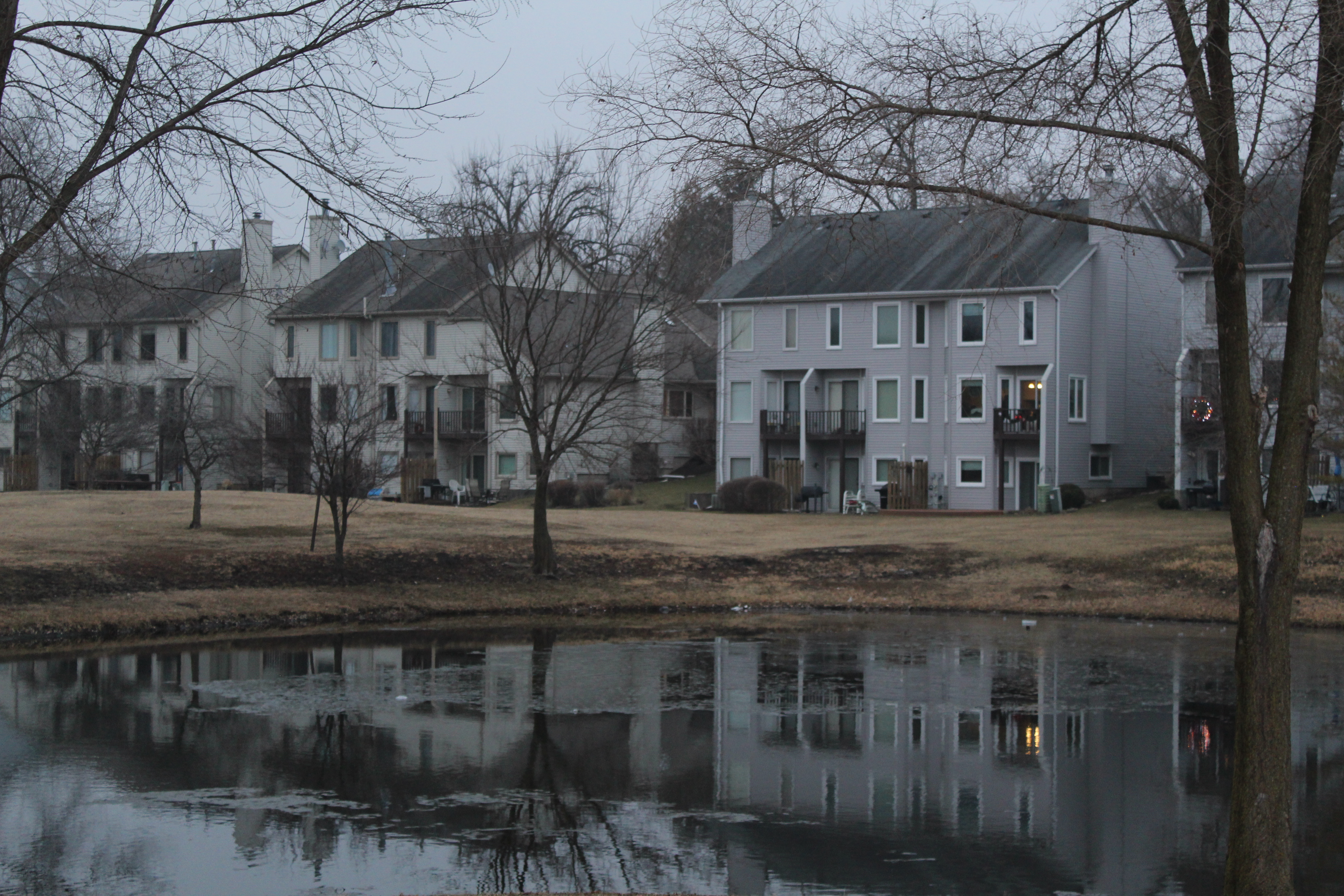
Townhomes in suburban Fox River Grove, Illinois

In other cities throughout the United States, such as Albany, New York; Cincinnati; Cleveland; Covington, Kentucky; Detroit; Hoboken, New Jersey; Jersey City; Lancaster, Pennsylvania; Norfolk; Pittsburgh; Reading, Pennsylvania; Richmond; Troy; and Wilmington, Delaware, row houses and terraced housing are also common, with row housing more focused on the center of the city, and later changing over to dense detached housing in outer neighborhoods. Scattered row homes and apartment rows can often be found in other eastern and Midwestern U.S. cities, specifically Minneapolis and St. Paul. The F. Scott Fitzgerald House in St. Paul is likely the most notable example of a row home in the Twin Cities. Columbus, Ohio has scattered row homes, along with smaller Midwest cities like Dubuque, Duluth, and Toledo. There are also scattered row homes and apartment rows in the oldest neighborhoods of Denver, Colorado.

== South America ==
=== Uruguay and Argentina ===
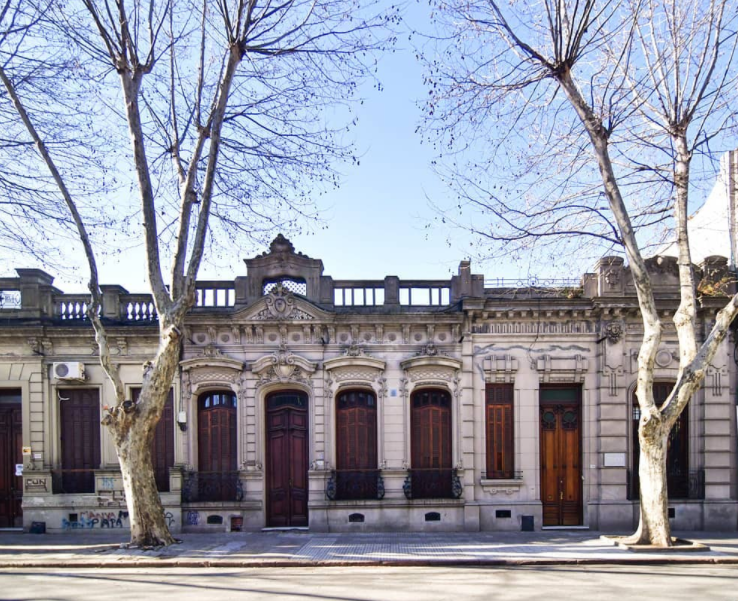
'Standard Houses' in Montevideo, Uruguay

Montevideo and Buenos Aires during the last decades of the 19th century developed a type of terraced house called the Standard House or informally 'Chorizo' House.

== Southeast Asia ==
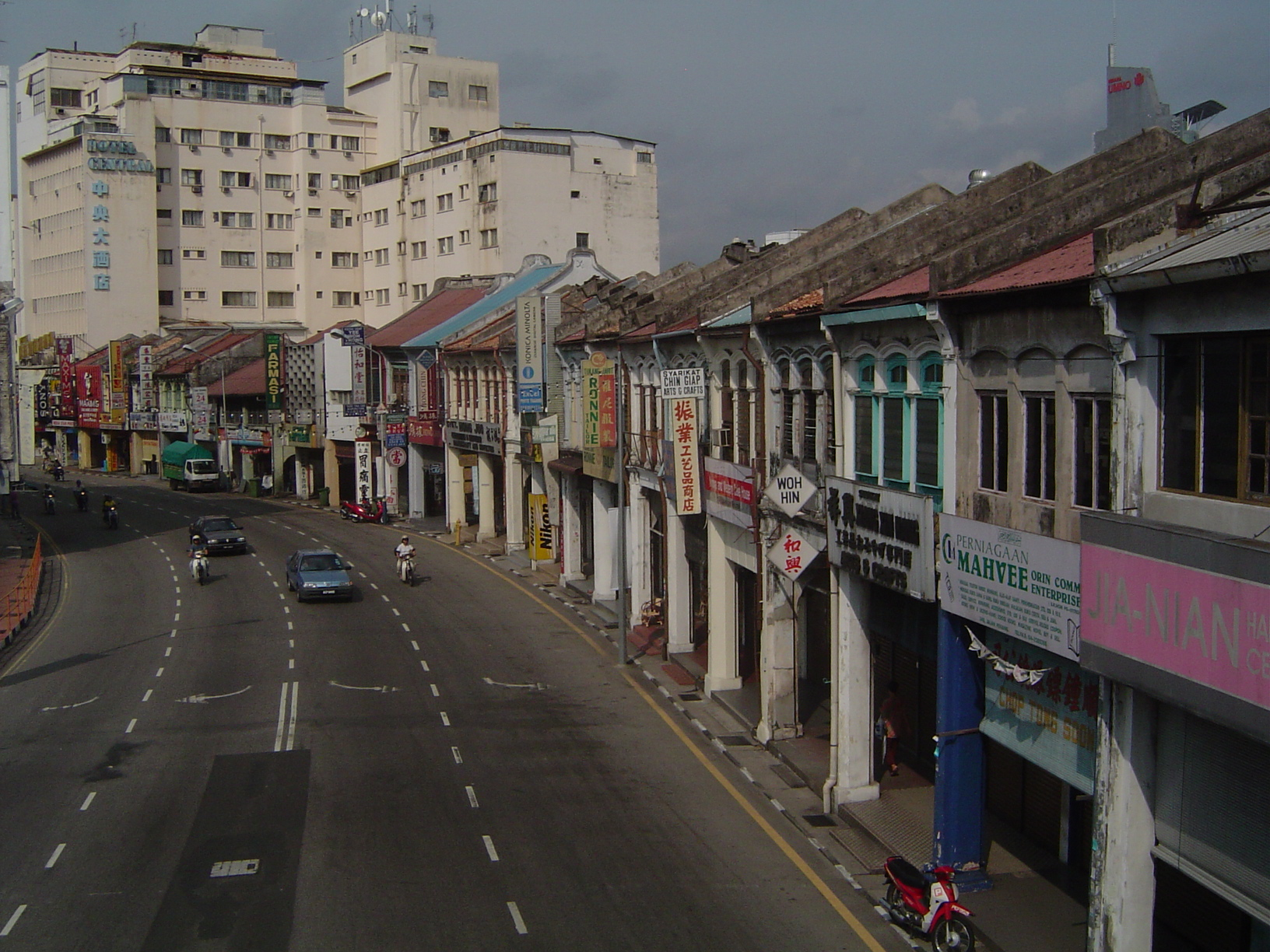
Shophouses in George Town, Penang, Malaysia

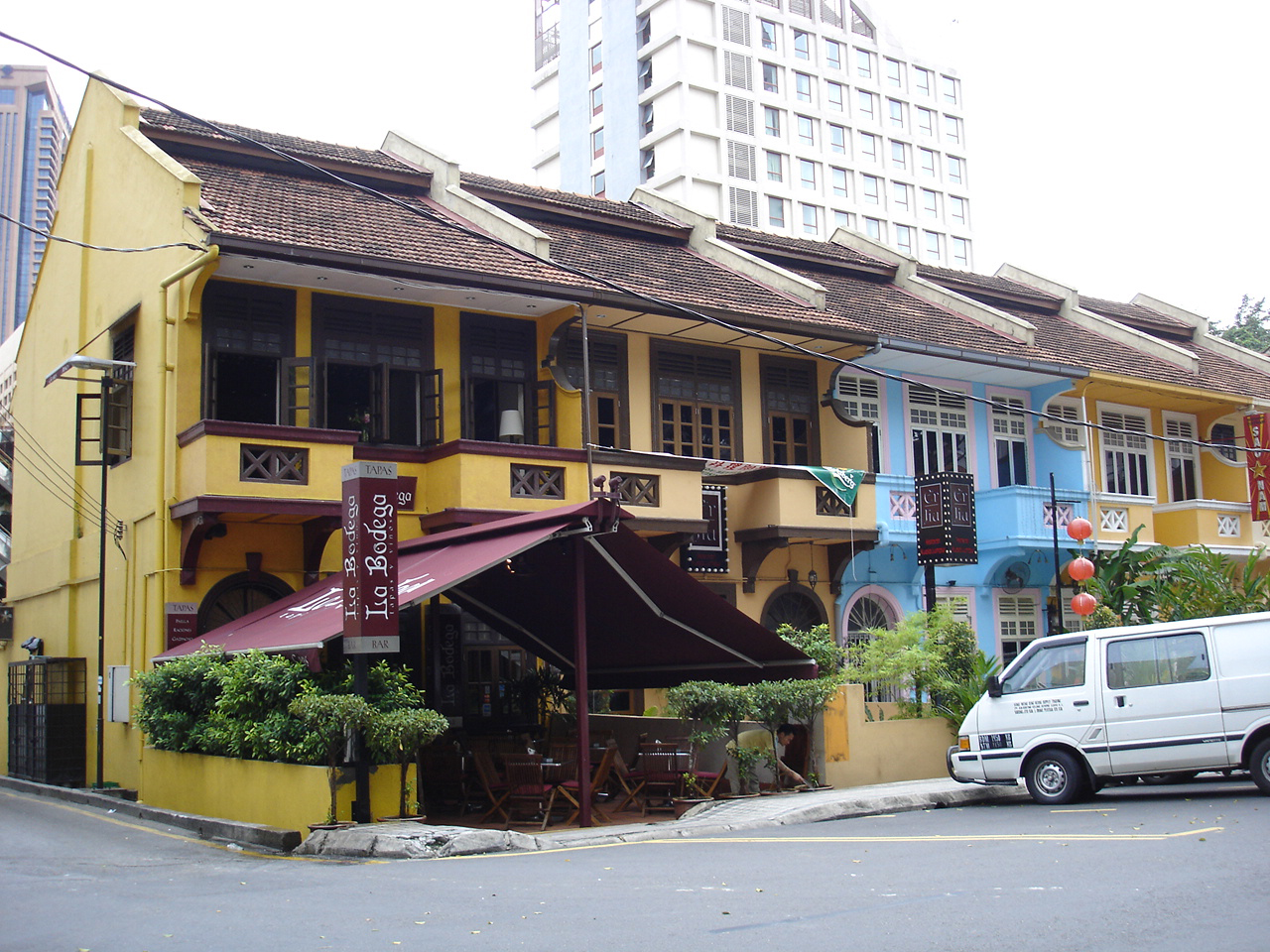
Pre-World War II terraced houses refurbished into restaurants and bars along Tengkat Tong Shin in Bukit Bintang, Kuala Lumpur

Introduced around the beginning of the twentieth century, terraced houses (also known as shophouses or linear linkhouses) have been adopted in both Malaysia and Singapore since the countries' early British colonial rule.

Based on British terraced home designs, the Southeast Asian variations are similar to their British counterparts (in which the living quarters are located on the front and top floor and the kitchen at the back) and were adapted to accommodate the area's tropical weather, which is primarily warm throughout the year and receives heavy rainfall. Earlier versions were more open, designed to better circulate air and features inner courtyards, with a frontal yard, rear yard, or both. A typical Malaysian and Singaporean terraced house is usually one or two floors high, but a handful of three or four storey terraced homes exist, especially newer terraced houses. Earlier variations followed traditional Western, Malay, India and Chinese architecture, as well as Art Deco and International stylings between the 1930s and 1950s.

The manner in which the buildings were designed varies by their location in an urban area. Derivatives located within city centres may also utilize their space for both commercial on the ground floor and residential use on the first floor and above (accurately known as shophouses, also similar to Lingnan buildings). Inner city terrace house design tended to lack any frontal yard at all, with narrow street frontages, hence the building's structure directly erected in front of the road. One of the reasons behind this was the taxing according to street frontage rather than total area, thereby creating an economic motivation to build narrow and deeply. A five foot way porch was usually laid out at the ground floor for use by both the residents and pedestrians. Alternatively, the porch may be sealed from the rest of the walkway to serve as personal space. Such designs became less common after the 1960s.

Terrace houses located on the outskirts of city centres were less restrictive, although the design of the building itself was not unlike those in the city. Certain homes tend to feature longer front yards, enough to accommodate cars. Others strictly serve as a small garden. This design remained in demand throughout the twentieth century, and a construction boom of the house design occurred in Malaysia since the 1940s, with numerous housing estates consisting of terrace homes sprouting in and around cities and towns. In the process, the design of the building began to diversify, with various refinements and style changes. Generally, the building's floor space and yards become larger and more elaborate through time, as is the modernisation of exterior construction and façade.

Certain older terrace houses tend to be converted for various new roles; some are converted into shophouses or business premises (including clubs, hotels and boarding homes–especially pre-independence houses–and kindergartens). Others have remained in use as residential units, are abandoned, neglected, or razed. Significant expansions are also common on all terrace homes; roofs and additional rooms may be added within the floorspace of the house's lot. Concerns are also raised with the limited maintenance and monitoring of deserted terrace homes, which potentially become hiding places for rodents and snakes (in yards with overgrown grass), and drug addicts.

Earlier variations of the terrace house were constructed with wood, later replaced with a masonry shell holding wooden beams to form foundations for the upper floors and tiled roof. Contemporary variations are primarily held together with reinforced concrete beams, which are later completed with concrete slabs, brick walls and tiled roofs.

== See also ==
- Alley house
- Back-to-back house
- List of house types
- Semi-detached
- Shotgun house
- Tong lau (East and Southeast Asia)
  - Shophouse
- Townhouse
- Machiya (Japanese version)

== References and notes ==
=== Further reading ===
- Chen (1998). The Encyclopedia of Malaysia. Vol. 5.
- Hayward, Mary Ellen; Belfoure, Charles (2001). The Baltimore Rowhouse. Princeton Architectural Press. ISBN 978-1-56898-283-0.
- Howells, T.; Morris, C. (1999). Terrace houses in Australia. Lansdowne: The Rocks, N.S.W. ISBN 1863026495.
- Muthesius, Stefan (1982). The English Terraced House. ISBN 9780300028713.
- Summerson, John (1988). Georgian London. ISBN 9780712620956.
- Summerson, John (1963) [1947]. John Wood and the English town-planning tradition. Heavenly Mansions.
