= Jewelers' Row, Philadelphia =

Neighborhood in Philadelphia, US

Jewelers' Row
- Neighborhood of Philadelphia
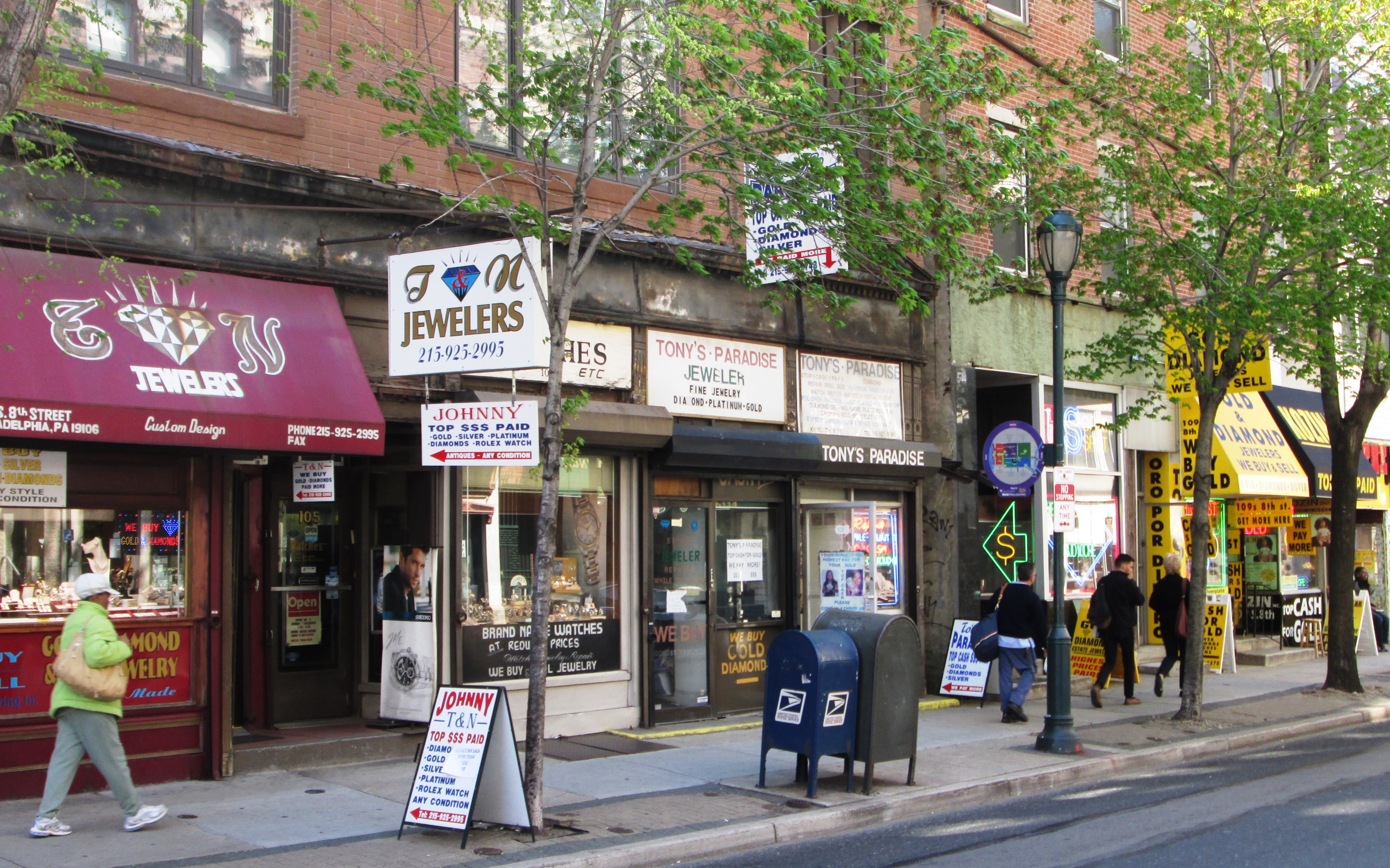
- Jewelers' Row: The west side of S. 8th Street between Sansom and Chestnut Streets looking north.

- Location within Philadelphia
- Country: United States
- State: Pennsylvania
- County: Philadelphia
- City: Philadelphia
- Area codes: 215, 267 and 445

Jewelers' Row, located in the Center City section of Philadelphia, Pennsylvania, United States, is composed of more than 300 retailers, wholesalers, and craftsmen located on Sansom Street between Seventh and Eighth Streets, and on Eighth Street between Chestnut and Walnut Streets.

It is the oldest diamond district in America and second in size only to the one in New York City. Many of the area's retail, jewelrymaking, and appraisal businesses have been owned by the same families for five generations.

== History ==
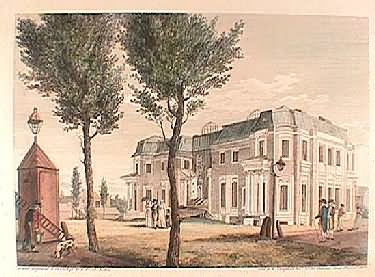
Morris' folly. Engraving from 1800 by William Birch.

Jeweler’s Row (Carstairs Row) was designed by builder and architect Thomas Carstairs circa 1799 through 1820, for developer William Sansom, as part of the first speculative housing developments in the United States and introduction of the row house in the United States. Carstairs Row was built on the southern part of the site occupied by "Morris' Folly" – Robert Morris’ unfinished mansion designed by Pierre Charles L'Enfant.

Sansom bought (at sheriff's sale) the property and unfinished house of Robert Morris, on Walnut St. between 7th and 8th Sts. He bisected the land with a new east-west eponymous street. Carstairs purchased the south side of Sansom St. and erected 22 look-alike dwellings. Prior to this time houses had been built not in rows, but individually. It can be contrasted with Elfreth's Alley where all the house are of varying heights and widths, with different street lines, doorways and brickwork.

The grid pattern laid down by William Penn and continued by subsequent planners and surveyors heavily influenced the row house form of architecture. The block of row houses is an important example of Philadelphia’s architectural and developmental history.

Sansom erected the buildings on what was then the outskirts of Philadelphia. To attract tenants he paved Sansom Street at his own expense. He then hired Benjamin Latrobe to design another row on the 700 block of Walnut Street. A prominent feature of the street is the repetitive flat expanse of the buildings, which made it ideal for commercial conversion.

In 2016, real estate company Toll Brothers obtained a zoning and demolition permit to construct a twenty-nine story tower of condominiums on the 700 block of Sansom Street. Specifically, five buildings from 702 to 710 Sansom would be demolished. The Preservation Alliance for Greater Philadelphia nominated two of the buildings for listing in the Philadelphia Register of Historic Places, which included the former Publishing House of Henry C. Lea, Co. at 706 Sansom Street and a former Electrotype Foundry at 704 Sansom Street. This decision has been met with fierce local opposition, with signs denouncing the project appearing in the windows of several buildings on Sansom Street, as well as criticism from Philadelphia Inquirer architecture columnist Inga Saffron.

== Changes throughout the years ==
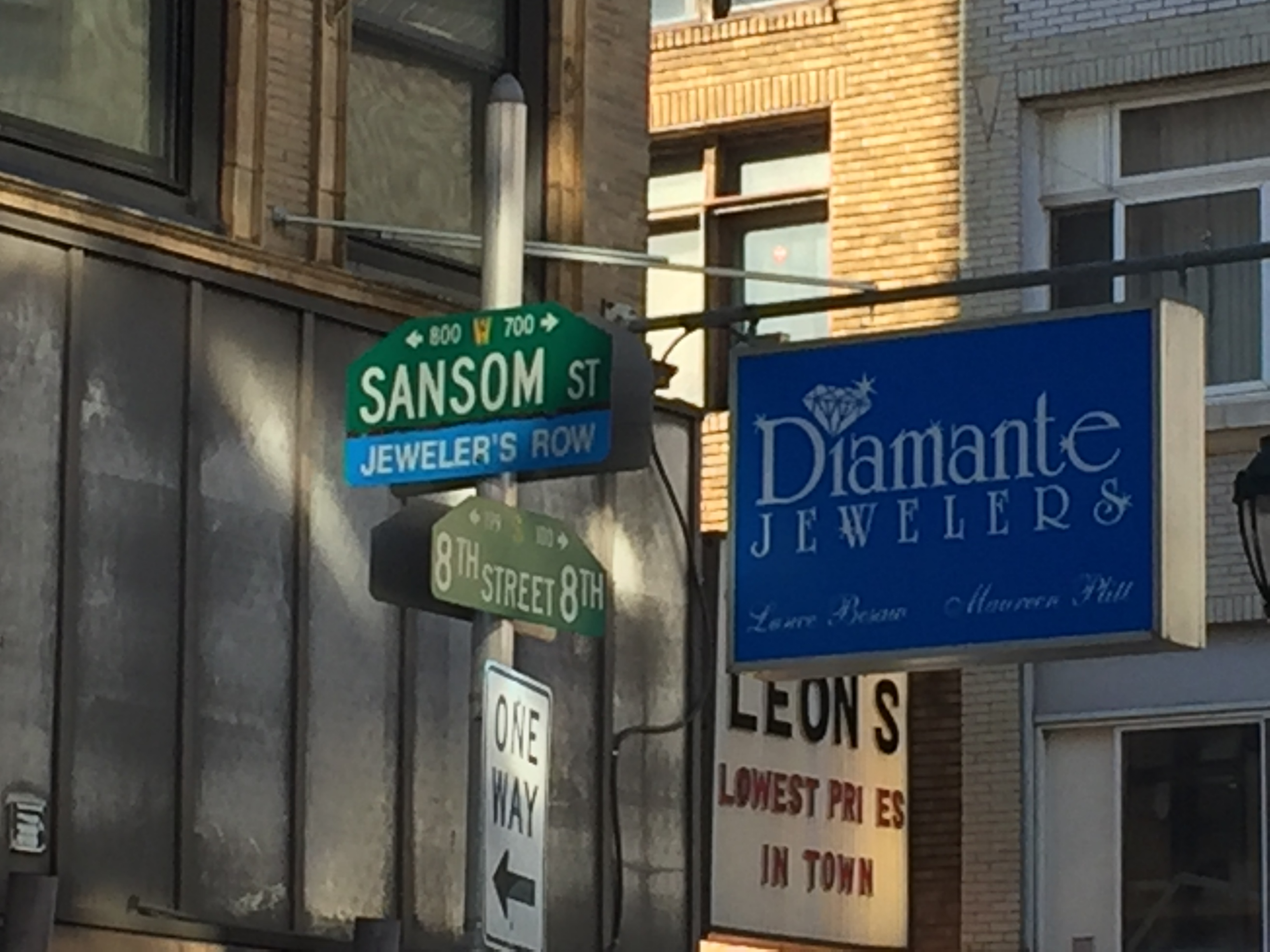
Street signage

Alterations in the late 19th and early 20th centuries changed most of the row – only 700, 730 and 732 Sansom retained their original experience. 710 Sansom, built in 1870, is a three-story commercial building with stone lintels. Its Victorian style is typical of the buildings that became the center for jewelry and diamond merchants who developed Jewelers’ Row in the mid-19th century (1860–1879).

722 Sansom was originally built in the 1860s and was redesigned in the early 1900s when steel became available. 724 Sansom, built in 1875, has a cast iron first floor.

After the homes were sold for commercial interests, several engravers of plates for books moved in. At 732, the engraver for Edgar Allan Poe lived and worked. His customer, Poe, ate dinner in the house on several occasions.

== See also ==
- Independence National Historical Park
- Goldsmith
- Silversmith
- Bench Jeweler
