= Jewelry district =

Jewelry district may refer to:

- a diamond district
- Jewelry District (Los Angeles), United States
- Jewelry District (Providence), Rhode Island, United States

== See also ==
- Jewellery
- Jewellery Quarter, Birmingham, England
