= Diamond district =

A diamond district is an area where the cutting, polishing, and trade of diamonds and other gems takes place. There are a number of these districts around the world, including:

- Antwerp diamond district, Belgium
- Surat Diamond Bourse, Surat, India
- Diamond Exchange District, Israel
- Hatton Garden, London, England
- Jewellery Quarter, Birmingham, England
- Diamond District, Manhattan, New York, United States
- Jewelers' Row, Philadelphia, United States
- Jewelry District (Los Angeles), United States
- Jewelry District (Providence), Rhode Island, United States
- Jewelers' Row, Chicago, United States

== See also ==
- Jewelry district (disambiguation)
- Diamond Historic District (Lynn, Massachusetts)
- Diamond District, an American hip-hop group (Oddisee, Uptown XO & Yu).
