= Trinity house (Philadelphia) =

Small townhouse in Philadelphia, Pennsylvania

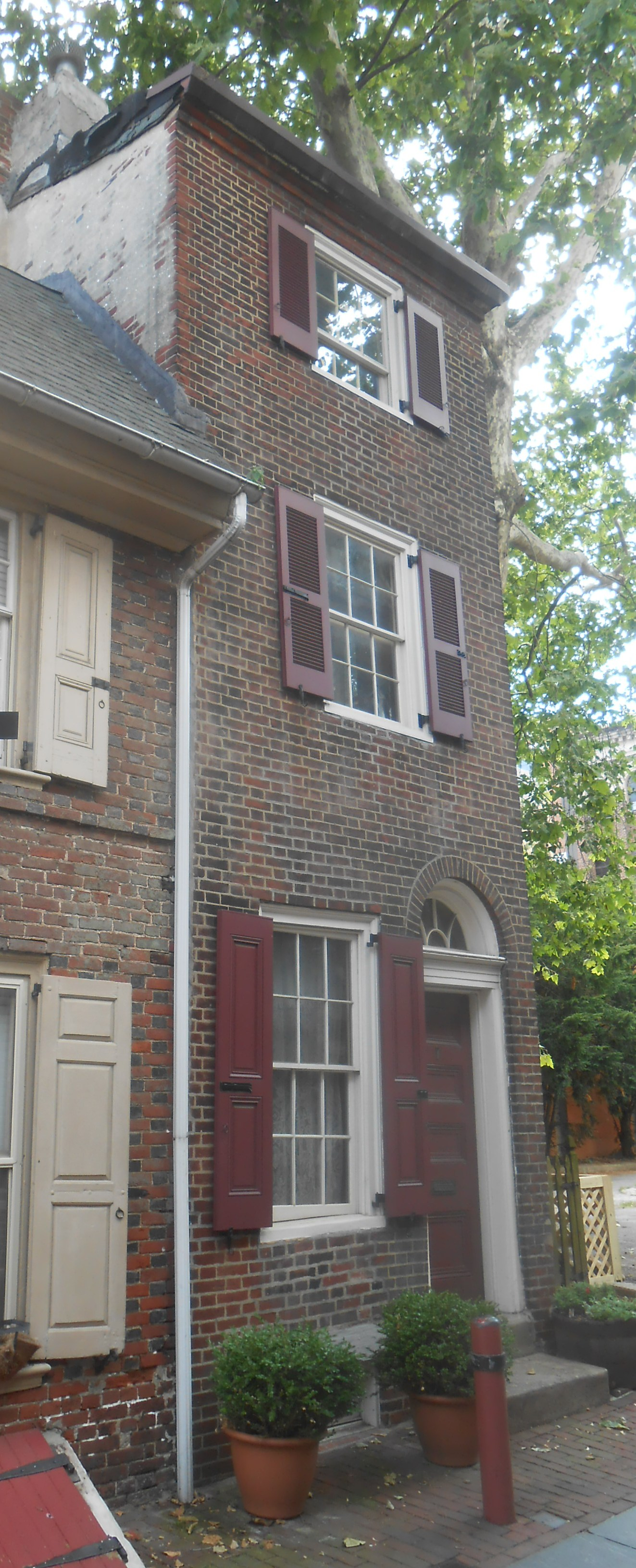
134 Elfreth's Alley, Philadelphia

A Trinity house, also known as a band-box house or a Father, Son & Holy Ghost house, is a small townhouse, principally found in Philadelphia, Pennsylvania. Trinity houses are characterized by small size, with three or four floors vertically stacked, each usually consisting of one principal room, many of which were built in the 18th and 19th centuries. They are joined by small, winding stairways, and have few or no interior doors. The "Trinity" name is derived from three floors, three rooms. Kitchens are usually in the basement, with very low headroom. Houses are typically smaller than 1,000 square feet (93 m^{2}), and about 14 feet (4.3 m) wide. The selection of furnishings for such houses is strictly limited by the difficulty of moving furniture between floors.

Trinity houses were typically located on alleys behind main streets, to be found in Philadelphia's deep blocks. A notable concentration of trinity houses is on Elfreth's Alley, a National Historic Landmark district. Due to their size and the inconvenience of their arrangements and their survival in affluent neighborhoods, trinity houses are often far more affordable than other houses in the same neighborhood. The houses have enjoyed a revival in interest as a by-product of the tiny-house movement.

== History ==
The production of Trinity houses is often cited as coming from the 17th Century from architect, William Penn when he laid out the city's urban plan. It is believed the first Trinity House in Philadelphia was built in 1715 with it intended to house Penn and his family.

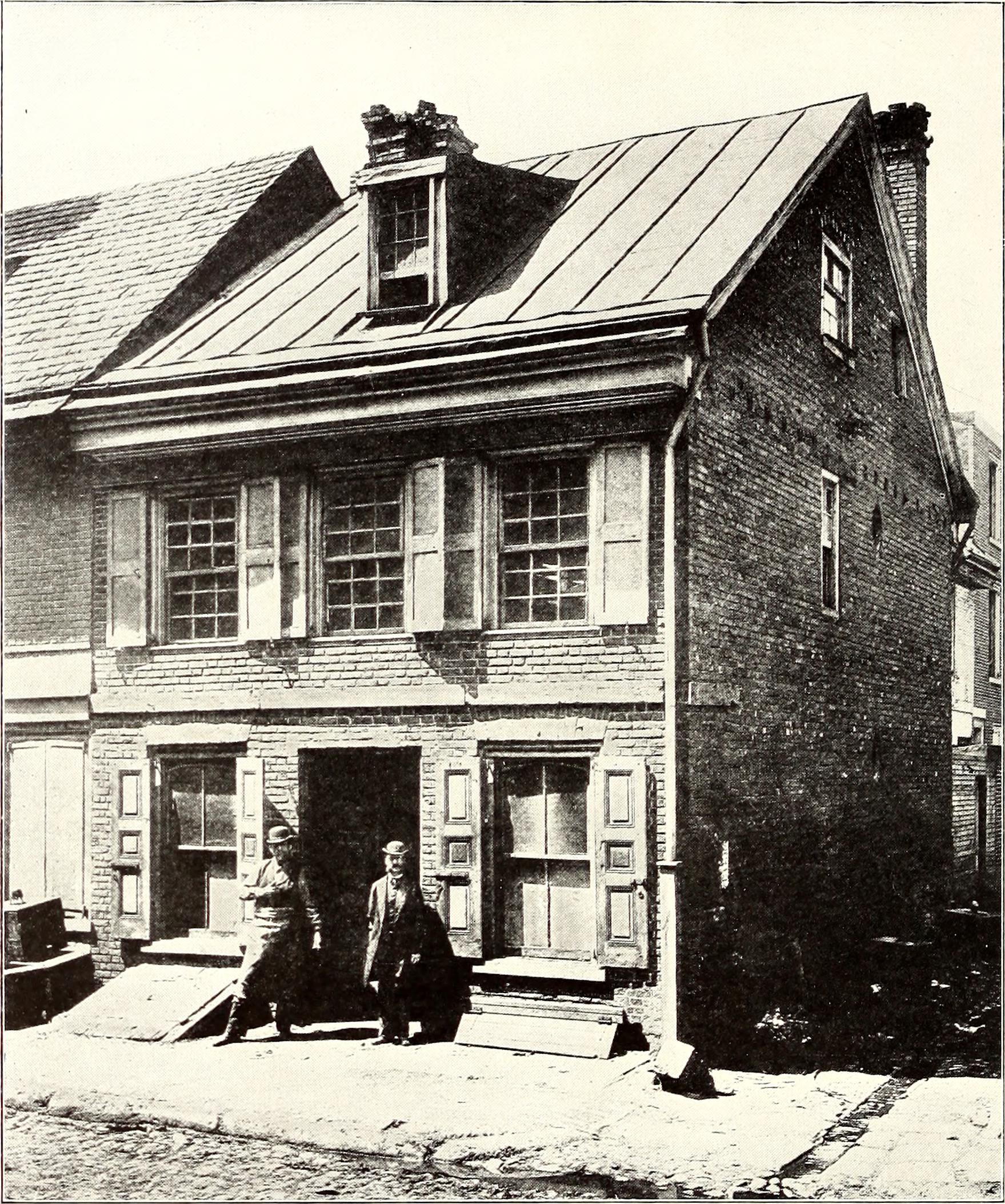
Letitia Street House, the first Trinity House in its original location.

Penn's urban organisation left many vacant lands between buildings with him wanting allow distance between neighbours, creating what Penn described as "greene country towne" This design ethos left much vacant space which was needed as the city developed into the 18th Century when population arose.

To meet the new housing demands of the 18th Century, the larger blocks were subdivided, adding alleyways and smaller streets running between the main avenues. Townhouses went up in these spaces to maximize housing. Meanwhile, builders bought up the cheaper land along the inner alleyways. These early Trinity Houses were built in the Georgian style of the time.

These townhouses, which were generally three stories in height, came to be known as "trinity houses," which both referred to the three-levels of the house as well as the holy Catholic trinity of "Father, Son, and Holy Spirit."

The oldest surviving Trinity Houses are on Elfreth's Alley, Philadelphia with it having achieved status of a National Historic Landmark originally having been built between 1703-1836.

The houses were originally built for the working-classes and artisans as affordable housing.
