= Elfreth's Alley =

Historic street and neighborhood in Philadelphia, Pennsylvania

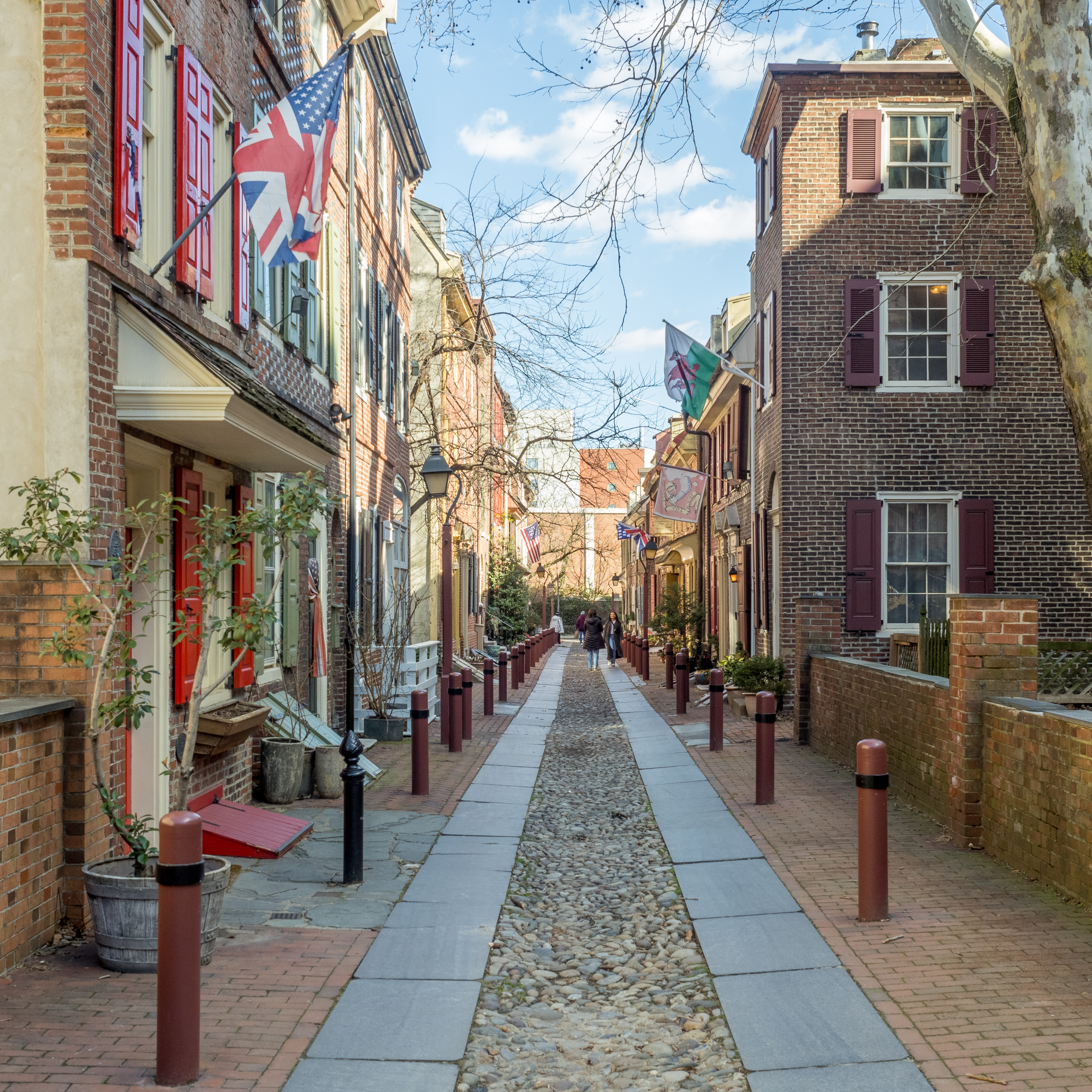
- Elfreth’s Alley in the Old City section of Philadelphia in 2024

- Location within Philadelphia
- Namesake: Jeremiah Elfreth
- Type: Alley
- Area: approx. 40,000 square feet (3,700 m^{2})
- Location: Philadelphia, Pennsylvania, U.S.
- Postal code: 19106
- West end: N. 2nd St
- East end: N. Front St

Other
- Known for: "Our nation's oldest residential street"
- Website: www.elfrethsalley.org
- Elfreth's Alley Historic District
- U.S. National Register of Historic Places
- U.S. National Historic Landmark District
- Location within Philadelphia
- Coordinates: 39.9528°N 75.1425°W
- Built: 1703 (founded); 1720–1836 (houses built)
- Architect: multiple
- NRHP reference No.: 66000681

Significant dates
- Added to NRHP: October 9, 1960
- Designated NHLD: October 9, 1960

Elfreth's Alley is a historic street in the Old City neighborhood of Philadelphia, dating back to 1703. The street has 32 houses, built between 1703 and 1836. The Elfreth's Alley Museum is located at #124 and 126. The alley, a National Historic Landmark, runs from North Front to North 2nd streets, paralleling Arch and Quarry streets.

== History ==
=== 18th century ===
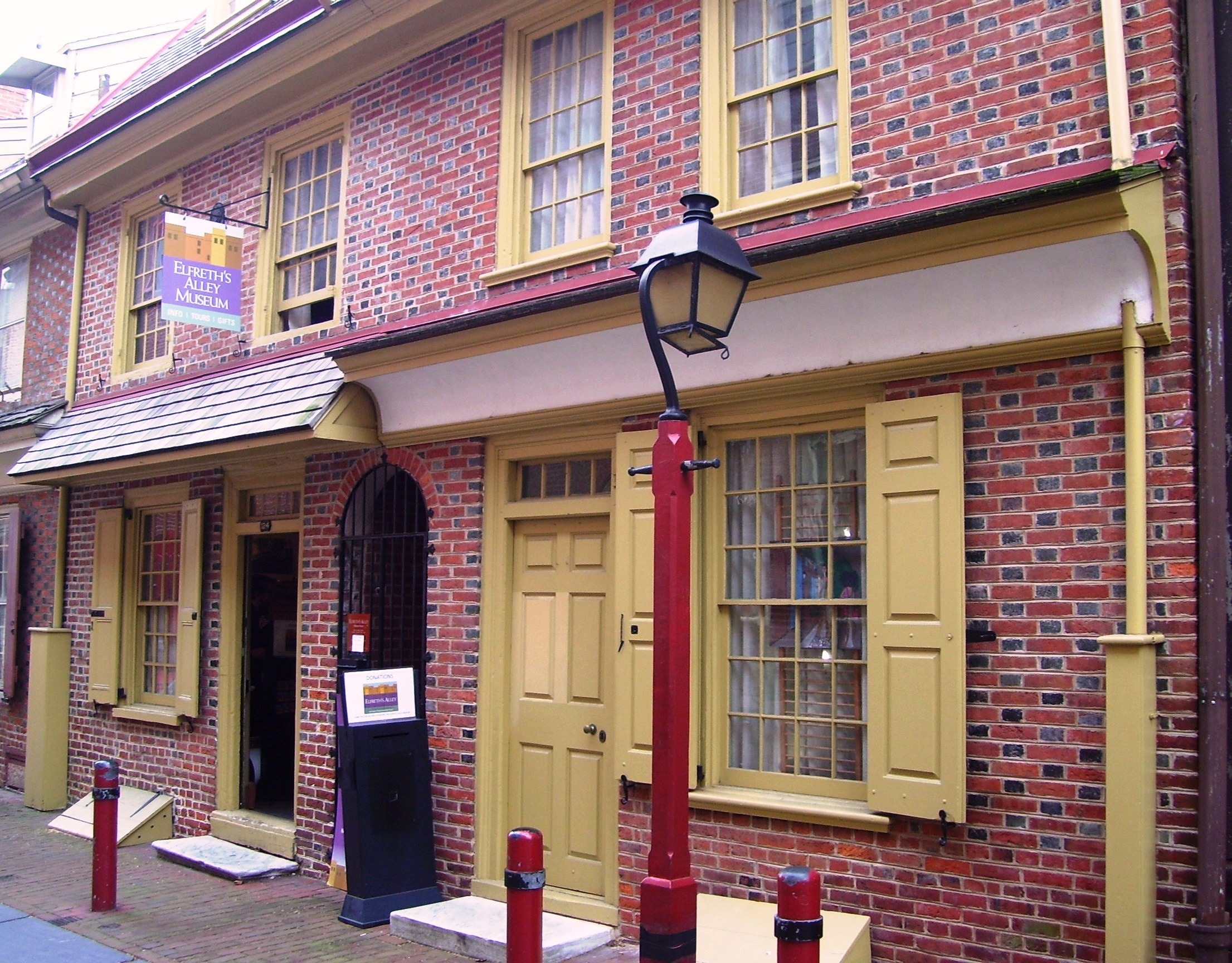
Elfreth's Alley Museum in March 2012

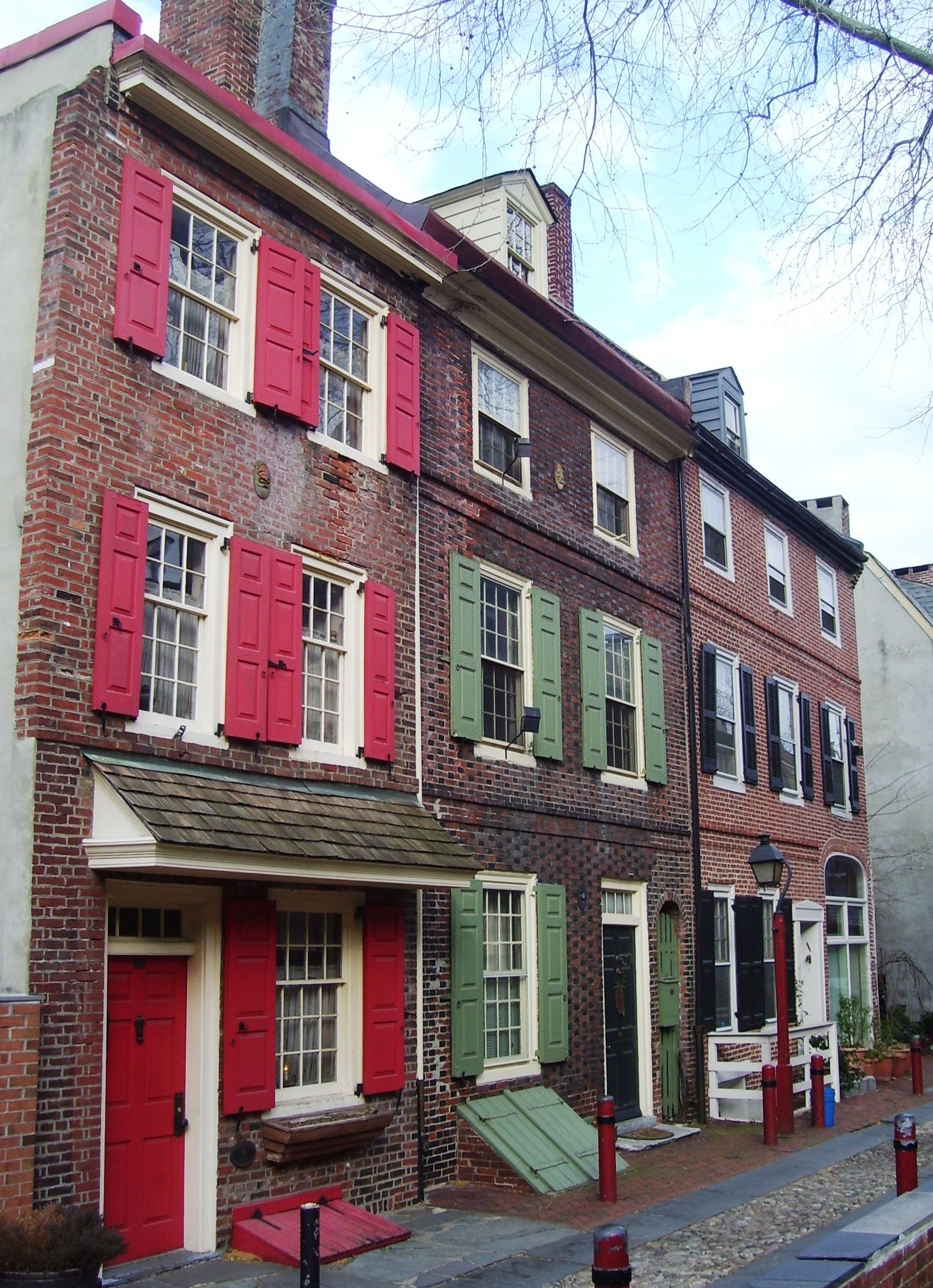
The north side of the alley near N. 2nd Street in 2012

The alley itself was opened between 1702 and 1704 by mutual agreement between Arthur Wells and John Gilbert, both of whom lived on Front Street. Wells donated 5 feet of land extending from Front to Second Streets on the south side of the intended alley, while Gilbert, who owned the land on the north, donated 10 feet. Because Arthur Wells died shortly after the alley was paid out, it was first known as Gilbert's Alley. Following his death, it came to be called Preston's Alley, after Paul Preston, who had married Gilbert's widowed daughter-in-law. Not until about 1750 was it commonly called Elfreth's Alley, for Jeremiah Elfreth, a blacksmith who then lived on Second Street just north of the alley. His first wife was a sister of Paul Preston's wife, and his fifth wife was the widow of a grandson of Arthur Wells. Elfreth had acquired title, through these two wives, to land on both sides of the alley at its Second Street end.

Among the alley's residents were tradesmen and their families, including shipwrights, silver and pewter smiths, glassblowers, and furniture builders. During the 1770s, one-third of the households were headed by women. The Georgian and Federal-style houses and cobblestone pavement of the alley were common in Philadelphia during this time. The houses are typically small, and many are uniquely Philadelphian Trinity houses.

=== 19th and 20th centuries ===
In the late 19th and early 20th centuries, industry began to change the street. Perhaps the first change was a stove factory that took its place in a row of residential houses in 1868. Eventually, factories surrounded Elfreth's Alley. The city's waterfront was only a few blocks away. Industry changed more than the architecture; successive waves of immigrants, lured by the nearby jobs, moved onto the street. In 1900, the neighborhood was overwhelmingly Irish.

In 1934, the Elfreth's Alley Association (EAA) was founded to preserve the alley's historic structures while interpreting the street's history. The EAA helped save the street from demolition due to Interstate-95 construction in the late 1950s. It also lobbied the city to restore the alley's name to "Elfreth's Alley"; it had been designated as the 100 block of Cherry Street years before as part of a street-name simplification program.

=== 21st century ===
Elfreth's Alley is today the product of cycles of urban renewal and decay, and historic preservation efforts. The alley is a tourist attraction and a rare surviving example of 18th-century working-class housing stock. The site stands in sharp contrast to the more frequently preserved grand mansion houses of Philadelphia's Society Hill neighborhood.

== Elfreth's Alley Museum ==
Elfreth's Alley Museum, located in 124–126 Elfreth's Alley, preserves the 18th-century home of a pair of dressmakers. Restored to its appearance in the Colonial era, exhibits in the house and tour guides interpret the life of the house and alley's residents in that era. Guides also discuss other houses on the alley and their inhabitants.

== Holiday celebrations ==
The Elfreth's Alley Association holds several holiday celebrations each year, whose proceeds support the upkeep and restoration of older homes.

For more than seventy years, Elfreth's Alley has celebrated "Fête Day" in early June, which celebrates the Alley's diverse ethnic heritage. Residents open their private homes to the public, and are accompanied by historical reenactments and festivities. The Brandywine Heights High School Band and their Fife and Drum Corps perform 18th-century fife tunes as they parade through the alley.

Sometime around the year 2000, Elfreth's Alley started holding "Deck the Alley" early every December, a self-guided tour of thirteen private homes festooned with Christmas and holiday decorations, and also includes caroling. The Alley also hosts events for Fourth of July, Oktoberfest, and Halloween.

== See also ==
- List of National Historic Landmarks in Philadelphia
- National Register of Historic Places listings in Center City, Philadelphia
