= List of cities, towns and villages in Qom province =

A list of cities, towns and villages in Qom Province of north-central Iran:

== Alphabetical ==
Cities are in bold text; all others are villages.

=== A ===
Ab Danak | Abadi Emamzadeh Esmail | Abarjes | Abbasabad | Abdolabad-e Pa'in | Aghelak | Ahmadabad | Alborz | Algan | Aliabad | Aliabad | Aliabad-e Enqelab | Aliabad-e Nazarali Khan | Alikhan Beyki | Alvirabad | Amereh | Anayit Beyk | Anjileh | Anjirli | Asgarli |

=== B ===
Baghak | Bagh-e Now | Bagh-e Yek | Banabar | Baqerabad | Baqerabad | Besharatabad | Bidhand | Bostanabad

=== C ===
Chahak | Chal Gonbad | Chamanak | Cheshmeh Ali | Cheshmeh Palang-e Pain | Cheshmeh Shur

=== D ===
Dastgerd | Dastjerd | Dizar | Dizijan | Dowlatabad | Dowlatabad | Dowlatabad | Dowlatabad-e Aqa | Dulay Qarqi

=== E ===
Esfid | Eslamabad | Eslamabad

=== F ===
Farajabad | Feyzabad | Fordo | Fujerd

=== G ===
Gazabad | Giv | Golestan

=== H ===
Hajjiabad | Hajjiabad-e Aqa | Hajjiabad-e Neyzaz | Hasanabad | Hasanabad | Hemmatabad | Hesar-e Sorkh | Heydarabad | Hoseynabad | Hoseynabad-e Mish Mast | Hoseynabad-e Zand

=== I ===
Ilikhi Bolaghi | Isaabad

=== J ===
Jafarabad | Jafarabad | Jafariyeh | Jamkaran | Jannatabad | Jemezqan | Jerik Aghaj | Jondab | Jowzeh

=== K ===
Kahak | Kaj | Kalagh Neshin | Karimabad | Kasva | Kermejegan | Khadijeh Khatun | Khalajabad | Khaveh | Khederabad | Khorramabad | Khowrabad | Kiab | Kohandan | Kondrud | Kuh Sefid | Kurgal

=== L ===
Langerud

=== M ===
Mahmudabad | Majidabad | Malekabad | Mansurabad | Maqbulabad | Masumabad | Mehrzamin | Meyyem | Mirabad | Mobarakabad | Mohammad Beyk | Mohammadabad | Moqbelabad | Moshkabad | Mowmenabad | Mujan | Mushakiyeh

=== N ===
Najmabad | Navaran | Nayeh | Nevis | Neyjeh | Neyzar | Nurabad | Nurabad

=== P ===
Pachian | Pestagan |

=== Q ===
Qahan | Qaleh Cham | Qaleh Soltan Baji | Qaleh-ye Allahqolibeyk | Qaleh-ye Sadri | Qaleh-ye Sangi | Qanavat | Qanbar Ali | Qarah Su | Qashqa Bolagh | Qazi-ye Bala | Qazi-ye Pain | Qeshlaq-e Alborz | Qeshlaq-e Malek Qaleh | Qezelabad | Qobad Bazn | Qom | Qomrud

=== R ===
Rahjerd | Rahmatabad | Rastehgan | Rushagan

=== S ===
Sadabad | Safarabad | Safdar | Salafchegan | Salafchegan | Sanavand | Sanjagan | Sarajeh | Sariyeh Khatun | Sarm | Sefidaleh | Seft | Seydabad | Seydabad | Seyfabad | Seyyedabad | Shahrak-e Dam | Shahzadeh Ebrahim | Shamsabad | Sharifabad | Sharifabad-e Gavkhuni | Sharifabad-e Zand | Shurab | Siru | Sorkh Deh | Sulaqan

=== T ===
Taghrud | Taj Khatun | Tarlab | Tayqan | Tinuj | Tireh

=== V ===
Varnavaj | Varzaneh | Vasfownjerd | Vayrij | Venan | Verjan | Veshareh | Veshnavah

=== Y ===
Yekeh Bagh

=== Z ===
Zanburak | Zavarian | Zizgan
