= Dowlatabad, Qom =

Dowlatabad (Persian: دولت اباد) in Qom Province may refer to:

- Dowlatabad-e Aqa
- Dowlatabad (34°42′ N 50°27′ E), Jafarabad
- Dowlatabad (34°49′ N 50°35′ E), Jafarabad
- Dowlatabad, Salafchegan
