= Qazi, Iran (disambiguation) =

Qazi (Persian: قاضي) in Iran may refer to:

- Qazi, Samalqan, a city in Maneh and Samalqan County, North Khorasan province
- Qaziabad, Dorud, a village in Lorestan province
- Qazi, Garmkhan, a village in North Khorasan province
- Qazi, Gifan, a village in North Khorasan province
- Qazi-ye Bala, a village in Qom province
- Qazi-ye Pain, a village in Qom province
- Qazi Rural District, in North Khorasan province
