= Ilikhi Bolaghi =

Ilikhi Bolaghi ايليخي بلاغي
- Village
- Location within Iran
- Coordinates: 35°06′47″N 50°49′16″E
- Country: Iran
- Province: Qom
- County: Qom
- Bakhsh: Central
- Rural District: Qomrud

Population (2006)
  - Total: 53
- Time zone: UTC+3:30 (IRST)
  - Summer (DST): UTC+4:30 (IRDT)

Ilikhi Bolaghi (Persian: ايليخي بلاغي, also Romanized as Īlīkhī Bolāghī; also known as Īlkh Bolāghī and Īlīkh) is a village in Qomrud Rural District, in the Central District of Qom County, Qom Province, Iran. At the 2006 census, its population was 53, in 14 families.
