= Dizijan =

Dizijan ديزيجان
- Village
- Location within Iran
- Coordinates: 34°24′42″N 50°23′00″E
- Country: Iran
- Province: Qom
- County: Qom
- Bakhsh: Salafchegan
- Rural District: Rahjerd-e Sharqi

Population (2006)
  - Total: 64
- Time zone: UTC+3:30 (IRST)
  - Summer (DST): UTC+4:30 (IRDT)

Dizijan (Persian: ديزيجان, also Romanized as Dīzījān and Dīzjān) is a village in Rahjerd-e Sharqi Rural District, Salafchegan District, Qom County, Qom Province, Iran. At the 2006 census, its population was 64, in 23 families.
