= Rahjerd =

Rahjerd (Persian: راهجرد) may refer to:

- Rahjerd, Hamadan
- Rahjerd, Qom
- Rahjerd-e Sharqi Rural District, an administrative division of Qom County
