= Baghak, Qom =

Baghak باغك
- Village
- Location within Iran
- Coordinates: 35°08′27″N 50°53′46″E
- Country: Iran
- Province: Qom
- County: Qom
- Bakhsh: Central
- Rural District: Qomrud

Population (2006)
  - Total: 48
- Time zone: UTC+3:30 (IRST)
  - Summer (DST): UTC+4:30 (IRDT)

Baghak (Persian: باغك, also Romanized as Bāghak) is a village in Qomrud Rural District, in the Central District of Qom County, Qom Province, Iran. At the 2006 census, its population was 48, in 15 families.
