= Cheshmeh Palang-e Pain =

Cheshmeh Palang-e Pain چشمه پلنگ پائین
- Village
- Country: Iran
- Province: Qom
- County: Qom
- Bakhsh: Central
- Rural District: Qomrud

Population (2006)
  - Total: 102
- Time zone: UTC+3:30 (IRST)
  - Summer (DST): UTC+4:30 (IRDT)

Cheshmeh Palang-e Pain (Persian: چشمه پلنگ پائین, also Romanized as Cheshmeh Palang-e Pā’īn) is a village in Qomrud Rural District, in the Central District of Qom County, Qom province, Iran. At the 2006 census, its population was 102, in 30 families.
