= Allahqoli =

Allahqoli الله‌قلی
- village
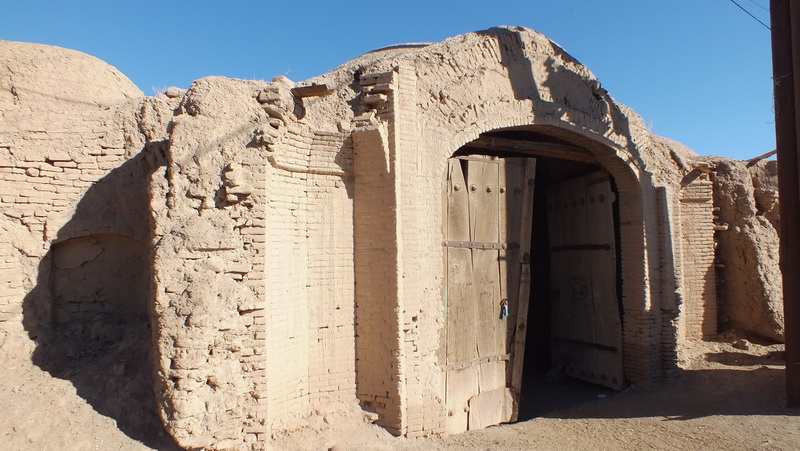
- Allahqoli Caravansarai

- Location within Iran
- Coordinates: 34°33′21″N 50°29′03″E
- Country: Iran
- Province: Qom
- County: Qom
- Bakhsh: Salafchegan
- Rural District: Rahjerd-e Sharqi

Population (2006)
  - Total: 39
- Time zone: UTC+3:30 (IRST)
  - Summer (DST): UTC+4:30 (IRDT)

Allahqoli (Persian: الله‌قلی, also Romanized as Qal‘eh-ye Allāhqolībeyk and Qal‘eh-ye Allāhqolībeyg) is a village in Rahjerd-e Sharqi Rural District, Salafchegan District, Qom County, Qom Province, Iran. At the 2006 census, its population was 39, in 12 families.
