= Farajabad, Qom =

Farajabad فرج اباد
- Village
- Location within Iran
- Coordinates: 34°46′11″N 51°10′08″E
- Country: Iran
- Province: Qom
- County: Qom
- Bakhsh: Central
- Rural District: Qomrud

Population (2006)
  - Total: 135
- Time zone: UTC+3:30 (IRST)
  - Summer (DST): UTC+4:30 (IRDT)

Farajabad (Persian: فرج اباد, also romanized as Farajābād and Farjābād) is a village in Qomrud Rural District, in the Central District of Qom County, Qom Province, Iran. At the 2006 census, its population was 135, in 30 families.
