= Qarah Su =

Qarah Su or Qareh Su (Persian: قره سو) may refer to:

- Qareh Su, Gilan
- Qareh Su, Golestan
- Qarah Su, Lorestan
- Qarah Su, Qom
- Qarah Su, Razavi Khorasan
- Qarah Su Rural District (disambiguation)

== See also ==
- Qara Su
