= Hesar-e Sorkh =

Hesar-e Sorkh or Hesar Sorkh (Persian: حصارسرخ) may refer to:

- Hesar-e Sorkh, Qom
- Hesar-e Sorkh, Fariman, Razavi Khorasan Province
- Hesar Sorkh, Nishapur, Razavi Khorasan Province
- Hesar-e Sorkh, Torqabeh and Shandiz, Razavi Khorasan Province
- Hesar-e Sorkh, Tehran

== See also ==
- Sorkh-e Hesar
