= Safarabad, Qom =

Safarabad صفراباد
- Village
- Location within Iran
- Coordinates: 34°50′20″N 51°00′56″E
- Country: Iran
- Province: Qom
- County: Qom
- Bakhsh: Central
- Rural District: Qomrud

Population (2006)
  - Total: 32
- Time zone: UTC+3:30 (IRST)
  - Summer (DST): UTC+4:30 (IRDT)

Safarabad (Persian: صفراباد, also Romanized as Şafarābād; also known as Qeshlāq-e Şafarābād) is a village in Qomrud Rural District, in the Central District of Qom County, Qom Province, Iran. At the 2006 census, its population was 32, in 9 families.
