= Asiaabad =

Asiaabad or Aseyaabad (Persian: اسي اباد) may refer to:

- Asiaabad, Kerman
- Asiaabad, Qom
