= Anjirli =

Anjirli انجيرلي
- Village
- Location within Iran
- Coordinates: 35°07′23″N 50°49′44″E
- Country: Iran
- Province: Qom
- County: Qom
- Bakhsh: Central
- Rural District: Qomrud

Population (2006)
  - Total: 102
- Time zone: UTC+3:30 (IRST)
  - Summer (DST): UTC+4:30 (IRDT)

Anjirli (Persian: انجيرلي, also Romanized as Anjīrlī; also known as Īndjīrlī) is a village in Qomrud Rural District, in the Central District of Qom County, Qom Province, Iran.

== Description ==
At the 2006 census, its population was 102, in 27 families.
