= Alborz, Qom =

Alborz البرز
- Village
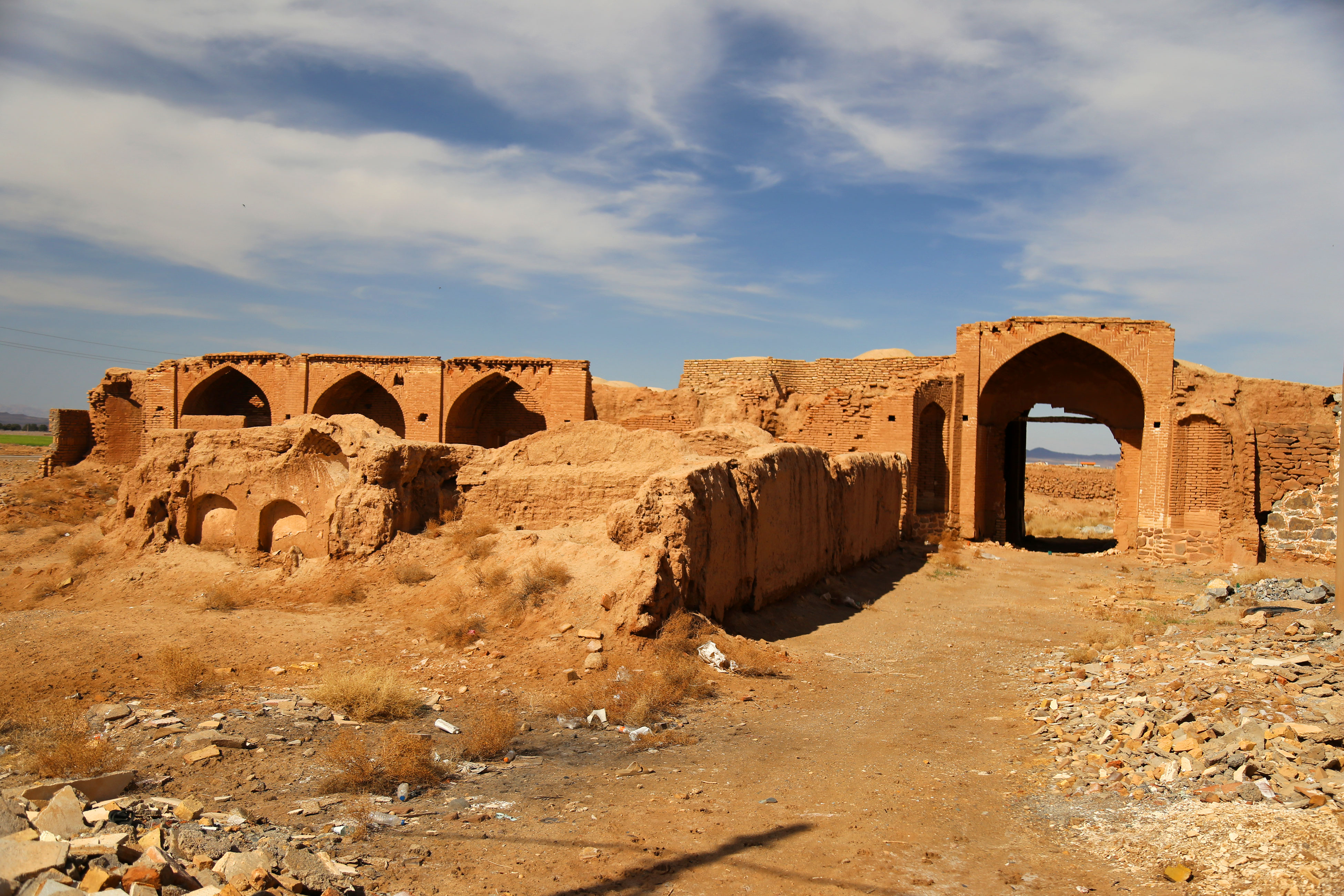

- Location within Iran
- Coordinates: 34°43′42″N 50°58′18″E
- Country: Iran
- Province: Qom
- County: Qom
- Bakhsh: Central
- Rural District: Qomrud

Population (2006)
  - Total: 136
- Time zone: UTC+3:30 (IRST)
  - Summer (DST): UTC+4:30 (IRDT)

Alborz (Persian: البرز, also Romanized as Alburz) is a village in Qomrud Rural District, in the Central District of Qom County, Qom Province, Iran. At the 2006 census, its population was 136, in 30 families.
