= Tarlab =

Tarlab طرلاب
- Village
- Location within Iran
- Coordinates: 34°33′11″N 50°38′09″E
- Country: Iran
- Province: Qom
- County: Qom
- Bakhsh: Salafchegan
- Rural District: Rahjerd-e Sharqi

Population (2006)
  - Total: 29
- Time zone: UTC+3:30 (IRST)
  - Summer (DST): UTC+4:30 (IRDT)

Tarlab (Persian: طرلاب, Romanized as Ţarlāb; also known as Ţollāb, Shūrāb Tarlāb, and Tālāb) is a village in Rahjerd-e Sharqi Rural District, Salafchegan District, Qom County, Qom Province, Iran. As of the 2006 census, its population was 29, in 11 families.
