= Qaleh Soltan Baji =

Qaleh Soltan Baji قلعه سلطان باجي
- Village
- Location within Iran
- Coordinates: 34°43′45″N 51°00′19″E
- Country: Iran
- Province: Qom
- County: Qom
- Bakhsh: Central
- Rural District: Qomrud

Population (2006)
  - Total: 247
- Time zone: UTC+3:30 (IRST)
  - Summer (DST): UTC+4:30 (IRDT)

Qaleh Soltan Baji (Persian: قلعه سلطان باجي, also Romanized as Qal‘eh Solţān Bājī, Qal‘eh-ye Solţān Bājī, and Qal‘eh-ye Soltān Bājī; also known as Sultānbāji) is a village in Qomrud Rural District, in the Central District of Qom County, Qom Province, Iran. At the 2006 census, its population was 247, in 54 families.
