= Mohammad Beyk =

Mohammad Beyk محمدبيك
- Village
- Location within Iran
- Coordinates: 34°32′54″N 50°29′02″E
- Country: Iran
- Province: Qom
- County: Qom
- Bakhsh: Salafchegan
- Rural District: Rahjerd-e Sharqi

Population (2006)
  - Total: 62
- Time zone: UTC+3:30 (IRST)
  - Summer (DST): UTC+4:30 (IRDT)

Mohammad Beyk (Persian: محمدبيك, also Romanized as Moḩammad Beyk and Moḩammad Beyg) is a village in Rahjerd-e Sharqi Rural District, Salafchegan District, Qom County, Qom Province, Iran. At the 2006 census, its population was 62, in 18 families.
