= Qashqa Bolagh =

Qashqa Bolagh (Persian: قشقابلاغ or قاشقابلاغ) may refer to:

- Qashqa Bolagh, Qom (قاشقابلاغ – Qāshqā Bolāgh)
- Qashqa Bolagh, West Azerbaijan (قشقابلاغ – Qashqā Bolāgh)
- Qashqa Bolagh-e Sofla, West Azerbaijan Province
