= Kurgal =

Kurgal كورگل
- Village
- Location within Iran
- Coordinates: 34°53′45″N 51°13′59″E
- Country: Iran
- Province: Qom
- County: Qom
- Bakhsh: Central
- Rural District: Qomrud

Population (2006)
  - Total: 76
- Time zone: UTC+3:30 (IRST)
  - Summer (DST): UTC+4:30 (IRDT)

Kurgal (Persian: كورگل, also Romanized as Kūrgal) is a village in Qomrud Rural District, in the Central District of Qom County, Qom Province, Iran. At the 2006 census, its population was 76, in 16 families.
