= Bagh-e Now, Qom =

Bagh-e Now باغ نو
- Village
- Location within Iran
- Coordinates: 34°43′38″N 51°00′41″E
- Country: Iran
- Province: Qom
- County: Qom
- Bakhsh: Central
- Rural District: Qomrud

Population (2006)
  - Total: 100
- Time zone: UTC+3:30 (IRST)
  - Summer (DST): UTC+4:30 (IRDT)

Bagh-e Now (Persian: باغ نو, also Romanized as Bāgh-e Now) is a village in Qomrud Rural District, in the Central District of Qom County, Qom Province, Iran. At the 2006 census, its population was 100, in 20 families.
