= Qeshlaq-e Alborz =

Qeshlaq-e Alborz قشلاق البرز
- Village
- Location within Iran
- Coordinates: 34°44′58″N 50°59′20″E
- Country: Iran
- Province: Qom
- County: Qom
- Bakhsh: Central
- Rural District: Qomrud

Population (2006)
  - Total: 161
- Time zone: UTC+3:30 (IRST)
  - Summer (DST): UTC+4:30 (IRDT)

Qeshlaq-e Alborz (Persian: قشلاق البرز, also Romanized as Qeshlāq-e Alborz) is a village in Qomrud Rural District, in the Central District of Qom County, Qom Province, Iran. At the 2006 census, its population was 161, in 35 families.
