= Kaj, Qom =

Kaj كاج
- Village
- Location within Iran
- Coordinates: 34°48′43″N 51°08′32″E
- Country: Iran
- Province: Qom
- County: Qom
- Bakhsh: Central
- Rural District: Qomrud

Population (2006)
  - Total: 100
- Time zone: UTC+3:30 (IRST)
  - Summer (DST): UTC+4:30 (IRDT)

Kaj (Persian: كاج, also Romanized as Kāj) is a village in Qomrud Rural District, in the Central District of Qom County, Qom Province, Iran. At the 2006 census, its population was 100, in 25 families.
