= Qaleh-ye Sadri =

Qaleh-ye Sadri قلعه صدرئ
- Village
- Location within Iran
- Coordinates: 34°40′12″N 50°47′24″E
- Country: Iran
- Province: Qom
- County: Qom
- Bakhsh: Central
- Rural District: Qomrud

Population (2006)
  - Total: 317
- Time zone: UTC+3:30 (IRST)
  - Summer (DST): UTC+4:30 (IRDT)

Qaleh-ye Sadri (Persian: قلعه صدرئ) is a village in Qomrud Rural District, in the Central District of Qom County, Qom Province, Iran. At the 2006 census, its population was 317, in 65 families.
