= Jafarabad, Qom =

Jafarabad جعفراباد
- Village
- Location within Iran
- Coordinates: 34°52′04″N 50°38′20″E
- Country: Iran
- Province: Qom
- County: Qom
- Bakhsh: Central
- Rural District: Qomrud

Population (2006)
  - Total: 93
- Time zone: UTC+3:30 (IRST)
  - Summer (DST): UTC+4:30 (IRDT)

Jafarabad (Persian: جعفراباد, also Romanized as Ja’farābād and Ja’far Ābād) is a village in Qomrud Rural District, in the Central District of Qom County, Qom Province, Iran. At the 2006 census, its population was 93, in 21 families.
