= Qanbar Ali =

Qanbar Ali قنبرعلي
- Village
- Location within Iran
- Coordinates: 34°43′42″N 51°08′15″E
- Country: Iran
- Province: Qom
- County: Qom
- Bakhsh: Central
- Rural District: Qomrud

Population (2006)
  - Total: 42
- Time zone: UTC+3:30 (IRST)
  - Summer (DST): UTC+4:30 (IRDT)

Qanbar Ali (Persian: قنبرعلي, also Romanized as Qanbar ‘Alī) is a village in Qomrud Rural District, in the Central District of Qom County, Qom Province, Iran. At the 2006 census, its population was 42, in 10 families.
