= Aliabad, Qomrud =

Aliabad علی‌آباد
- Village
- Location within Iran
- Coordinates: 34°47′58″N 51°05′07″E
- Country: Iran
- Province: Qom
- County: Qom
- Bakhsh: Central
- Rural District: Qomrud

Population (2006)
  - Total: 33
- Time zone: UTC+3:30 (IRST)
  - Summer (DST): UTC+4:30 (IRDT)

Aliabad (Persian: علی‌آباد, also Romanized as ‘Alīābād) is a village in Qomrud Rural District, in the Central District of Qom County, Qom Province, Iran. At the 2006 census, its population was 33, in 11 families.
