= Qaleh-ye Sangi, Qom =

Qaleh-ye Sangi قلعه سنگي
- Village
- Location within Iran
- Coordinates: 35°07′10″N 50°59′16″E
- Country: Iran
- Province: Qom
- County: Qom
- Bakhsh: Central
- Rural District: Qomrud

Population (2006)
  - Total: 15
- Time zone: UTC+3:30 (IRST)
  - Summer (DST): UTC+4:30 (IRDT)

Qaleh-ye Sangi (Persian: قلعه سنگي, also Romanized as Qal‘eh-ye Sangī and Qal’eh Sangī; also known as Sangī) is a village in Qomrud Rural District, in the Central District of Qom County, Qom Province, Iran. At the 2006 census, its population was 15, in 4 families.
