= Seydabad, Qom =

Village in Qom Province, Iran

Seydabad صيداباد
- Village
- Location within Iran
- Coordinates: 34°49′11″N 50°33′33″E
- Country: Iran
- Province: Qom
- County: Qom
- Bakhsh: Central
- Rural District: Qomrud

Population (2006)
  - Total: 96
- Time zone: UTC+3:30 (IRST)
  - Summer (DST): UTC+4:30 (IRDT)

Seydabad (Persian: صيداباد, also romanized as Şeydābād) is a village in Qomrud Rural District, in the Central District of Qom County, Qom Province, Iran. At the 2006 census, its population was 96, in 13 families.
