= Besharatabad =

Besharatabad بشارت اباد
- Village
- Location within Iran
- Coordinates: 34°24′12″N 50°22′20″E
- Country: Iran
- Province: Qom
- County: Qom
- Bakhsh: Salafchegan
- Rural District: Rahjerd-e Sharqi

Population (2006)
  - Total: 16
- Time zone: UTC+3:30 (IRST)
  - Summer (DST): UTC+4:30 (IRDT)

Besharatabad (Persian: بشارت اباد, also Romanized as Beshāratābād) is a village in Rahjerd-e Sharqi Rural District, Salafchegan District, Qom County, Qom Province, Iran. At the 2006 census, its population was 16, in 4 families.
