= Amereh =

Amereh or Amareh or Amreh (Persian: امره) may refer to:

- Amereh, Markazi
- Amreh, Amol, Mazandaran Province
- Amreh, Sari, Mazandaran Province
- Amereh, Qom
