= Qashqa Bolagh, Qom =

Qashqa Bolagh قاشقابلاغ
- Village
- Location within Iran
- Coordinates: 34°56′52″N 50°47′06″E
- Country: Iran
- Province: Qom
- County: Qom
- Bakhsh: Central
- Rural District: Qomrud

Population (2006)
  - Total: 37
- Time zone: UTC+3:30 (IRST)
  - Summer (DST): UTC+4:30 (IRDT)

Qashqa Bolagh (Persian: قاشقابلاغ, also Romanized as Qāshqā Bolāgh) is a village in Qomrud Rural District, in the Central District of Qom County, Qom Province, Iran. At the 2006 census, its population was 37, in 12 families.
