= Taj Khatun, Qom =

Village in Qom province, Iran

Taj Khatun Persian: تاج خاتون
- Village
- Location within Iran
- Coordinates: 34°33′07″N 50°29′47″E
- Country: Iran
- Province: Qom
- County: Qom
- District: Salafchegan
- Rural District: Rahjerd-e Sharqi

Population (2016)
  - Total: 369
- Time zone: UTC+3:30 (IRST)

Taj Khatun (Persian: تاج خاتون) (Note: Also romanized as Tāj Khātūn, Tāj Khvātūn, and Taj-i-Khātūn) is a village in Rahjerd-e Sharqi Rural District of Salafchegan District in Qom County, Qom province, Iran.

== Demographics ==
=== Population ===
At the time of the 2006 National Census, the village's population was 268 in 81 households. The following census in 2011 counted 253 people in 78 households. The 2016 census measured the population of the village as 369 people in 114 households.
