= Qazi-ye Pain =

Qazi-ye Pain قاضي پايين
- Village
- Location within Iran
- Coordinates: 34°32′07″N 50°29′48″E
- Country: Iran
- Province: Qom
- County: Qom
- Bakhsh: Salafchegan
- Rural District: Rahjerd-e Sharqi

Population (2006)
  - Total: 90
- Time zone: UTC+3:30 (IRST)
  - Summer (DST): UTC+4:30 (IRDT)

Qazi-ye Pain (Persian: قاضي پايين, also Romanized as Qāẕī-ye Pā’īn; also known as Qāẕī-ye Soflá) is a village in Rahjerd-e Sharqi Rural District, Salafchegan District, Qom County, Qom Province, Iran. At the 2006 census, its population was 90, in 23 families.
