= Moshkabad, Qom =

Village in Qom province, Iran

Moshkabad Persian: مشك اباد
- Village
- Location within Iran
- Coordinates: 34°52′16″N 51°15′37″E
- Country: Iran
- Province: Qom
- County: Qom
- District: Central
- Rural District: Qomrud

Population (2016)
  - Total: 202
- Time zone: UTC+3:30 (IRST)

Moshkabad (Persian: مشك اباد) (Note: Also romanized as Moshkābād; also known as Moshgābād-e Masīleh and Mushkābād) is a village in Qomrud Rural District of the Central District in Qom County, Qom province, Iran.

== Demographics ==
=== Population ===
At the time of the 2006 National Census, the village's population was 179 in 41 households. The following census in 2011 counted 207 people in 54 households. The 2016 census measured the population of the village as 202 people in 58 households.
