= Mirabad, Qom =

Village in Qom province, Iran

Mirabad Persian: ميراباد
- Village
- Location within Iran
- Coordinates: 34°44′51″N 51°06′39″E
- Country: Iran
- Province: Qom
- County: Qom
- District: Central
- Rural District: Qomrud

Population (2016)
  - Total: 284
- Time zone: UTC+3:30 (IRST)

Mirabad (Persian: ميراباد) (Note: Also romanized as Mīrābād; also known as Qal‘eh Mīrābād) is a village in Qomrud Rural District of the Central District in Qom County, Qom province, Iran.

== Demographics ==
=== Population ===
At the time of the 2006 National Census, the village's population was 204 in 48 households. The following census in 2011 counted 241 people in 68 households. The 2016 census measured the population of the village as 284 people in 89 households.
