= Eslamabad, Salafchegan =

Village in Qom province, Iran

Eslamabad Persian: اسلام اباد
- Village
- Location within Iran
- Coordinates: 34°31′21″N 50°30′28″E
- Country: Iran
- Province: Qom
- County: Qom
- District: Salafchegan
- Rural District: Rahjerd-e Sharqi

Population (2016)
  - Total: 237
- Time zone: UTC+3:30 (IRST)

Eslamabad (Persian: اسلام اباد) (Note: Also romanized as Eslāmābād) is a village in Rahjerd-e Sharqi Rural District of Salafchegan District in Qom County, Qom province, Iran.

== Demographics ==
=== Population ===
At the time of the 2006 National Census, the village's population was 202 in 59 households. The following census in 2011 counted 258 people in 81 households. The 2016 census measured the population of the village as 237 people in 80 households.
