= Zavarian =

Village in Qom province, Iran

Zavarian Persian: زواريان
- Village
- Location within Iran
- Coordinates: 34°26′46″N 50°23′55″E
- Country: Iran
- Province: Qom
- County: Qom
- District: Salafchegan
- Rural District: Rahjerd-e Sharqi

Population (2016)
  - Total: 202
- Time zone: UTC+3:30 (IRST)

Zavarian (Persian: زواريان) (Note: Also romanized as Zavārīān, Zavārīyān, and Zavāryān) is a village in Rahjerd-e Sharqi Rural District of Salafchegan District in Qom County, Qom province, Iran.

== Demographics ==
=== Population ===
At the time of the 2006 National Census, the village's population was 156 in 53 households. The following census in 2011 counted 134 people in 47 households. The 2016 census measured the population of the village as 202 people in 76 households.
