= Jamkaran =

Neighborhood in Qom province, Iran

Jamkaran جمكران
- Neighborhood
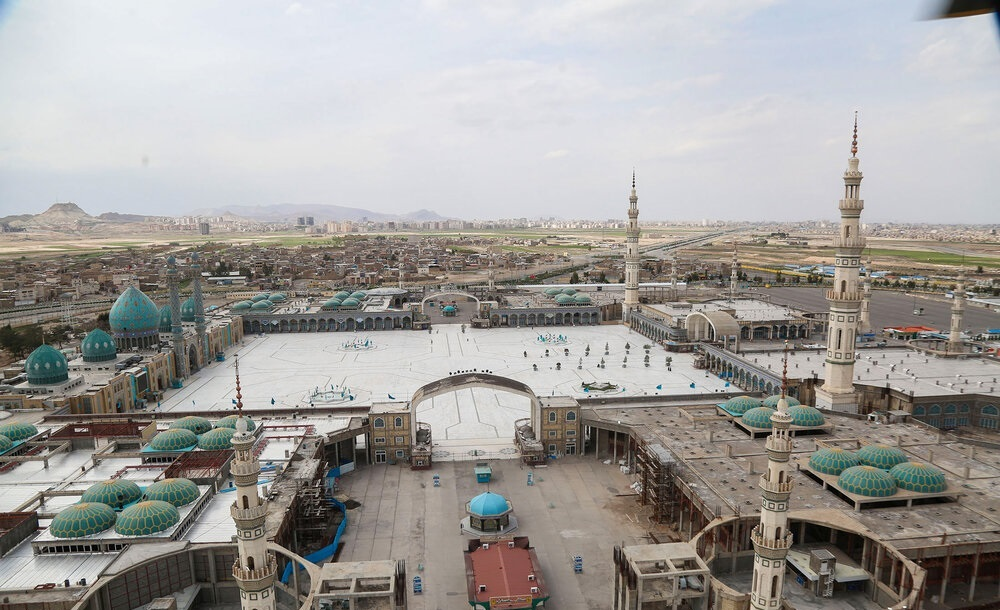
- Mosque in the neighborhood of Jamkaran

- Location within Iran
- Coordinates: 34°35′03″N 50°54′26″E
- Country: Iran
- Province: Qom
- County: Qom
- District: Central
- City: Qom

Population (2006)
  - Total: 8,368
- Time zone: UTC+3:30 (IRST)

Jamkaran (Persian: جمكران) (Note: Also romanized as Jamkarân, Jamkarān and Jam'karân; also known as Jam-e-Karân (جم کران) and Jamgarân (جمگران)) is a neighborhood in the city of Qom in the Central District of Qom County, Qom province, Iran.

== Demographics ==
=== Population ===
At the time of the 2006 National Census, Jamkaran's population was 8,368 in 1,747 households, when it was a village in Qanavat Rural District. It was annexed to the city of Qom in 2007.

== Overview ==
Jamkaran is located on the outskirts of Qom, and is the site of the Jamkaran Mosque, a popular pilgrimage site for Shia Muslims from all over the world. Shia belief has it that the Mahdi—the Twelfth Shia Imam, a figure from Shia eschatology who will lead the world to an era of universal peace—once appeared and offered prayers at Jamkaran.

On Tuesday evenings large crowds of thousands gather at Jamkaran to pray and to drop a note to the Imam in a well at the site, asking for help with some problem.
