= Sanjagan =

Village in Qom province, Iran

Sanjagan Persian: سنجگان
- Village
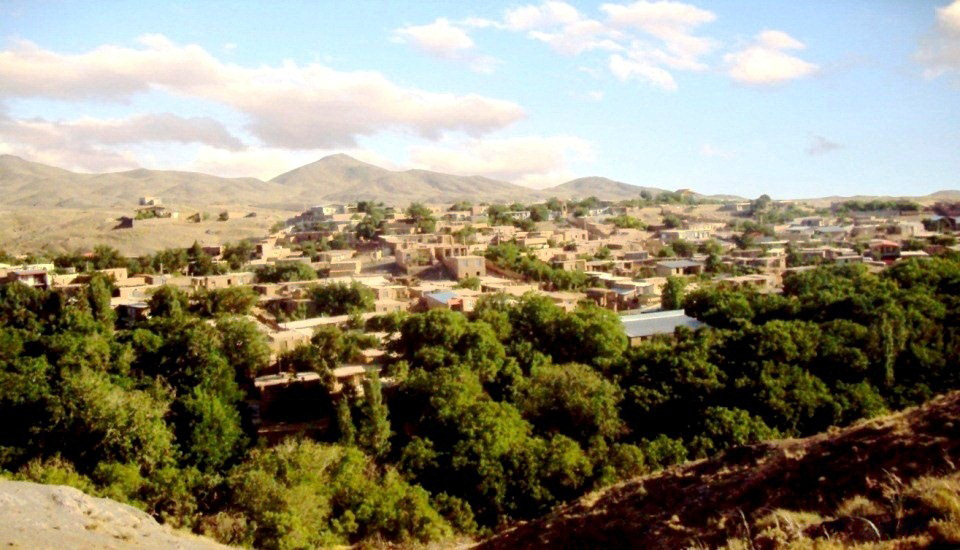
- The village of Sanjagan

- Location within Iran
- Coordinates: 34°30′23″N 50°19′26″E
- Country: Iran
- Province: Qom
- County: Qom
- District: Salafchegan
- Rural District: Rahjerd-e Sharqi

Population (2016)
  - Total: 250
- Time zone: UTC+3:30 (IRST)
- Area code: 025

Sanjagan (Persian: سنجگان) (Note: Also romanized as Sanjagān, Sanjegān, Sanjgān, Senjegān, Senjgān; also known as Sīnjgān) is a village in Rahjerd-e Sharqi Rural District of Salafchegan District in Qom County, Qom province, Iran. The village is known for its dam and historical area.

== Demographics ==
=== Population ===
At the time of the 2006 National Census, the village's population was 336 in 119 households. The following census in 2011 counted 259 people in 106 households. The 2016 census measured the population of the village as 250 people in 101 households.

== Photos ==
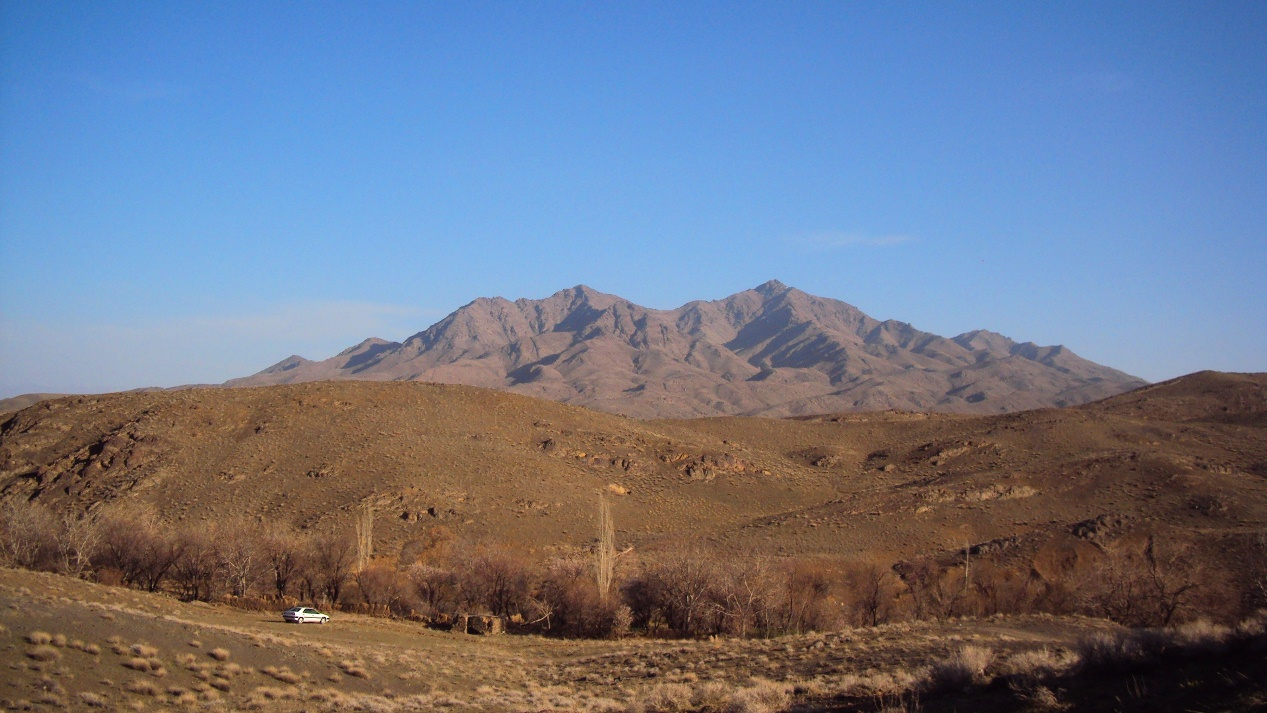
Mountain near Sanjagan

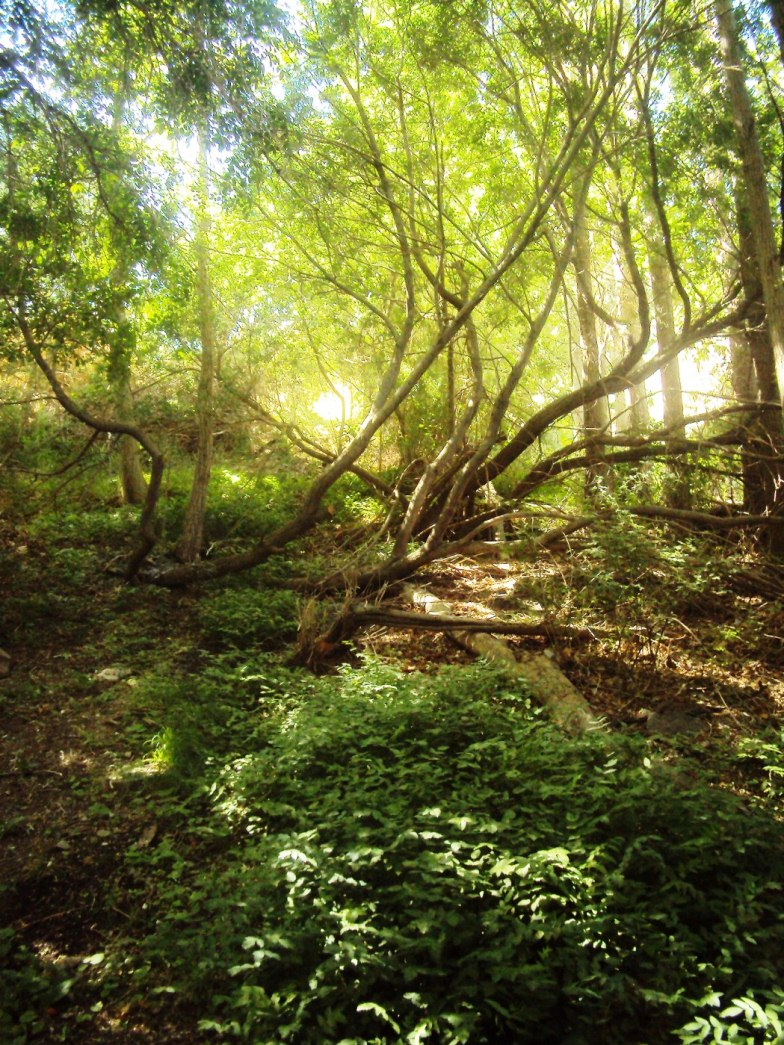
Landscape near Sanjagan

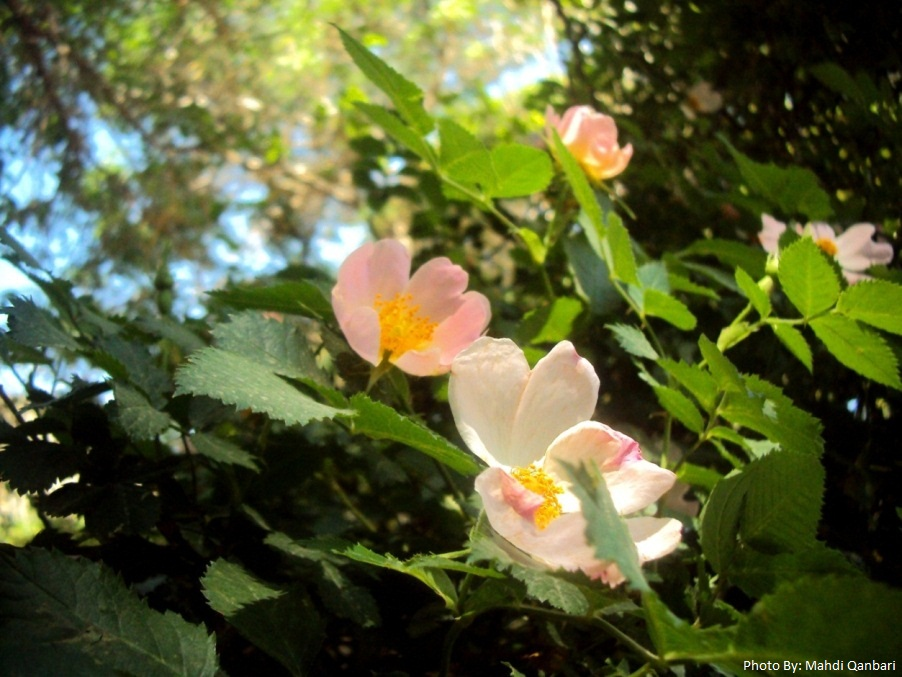
Landscape near Sanjagan

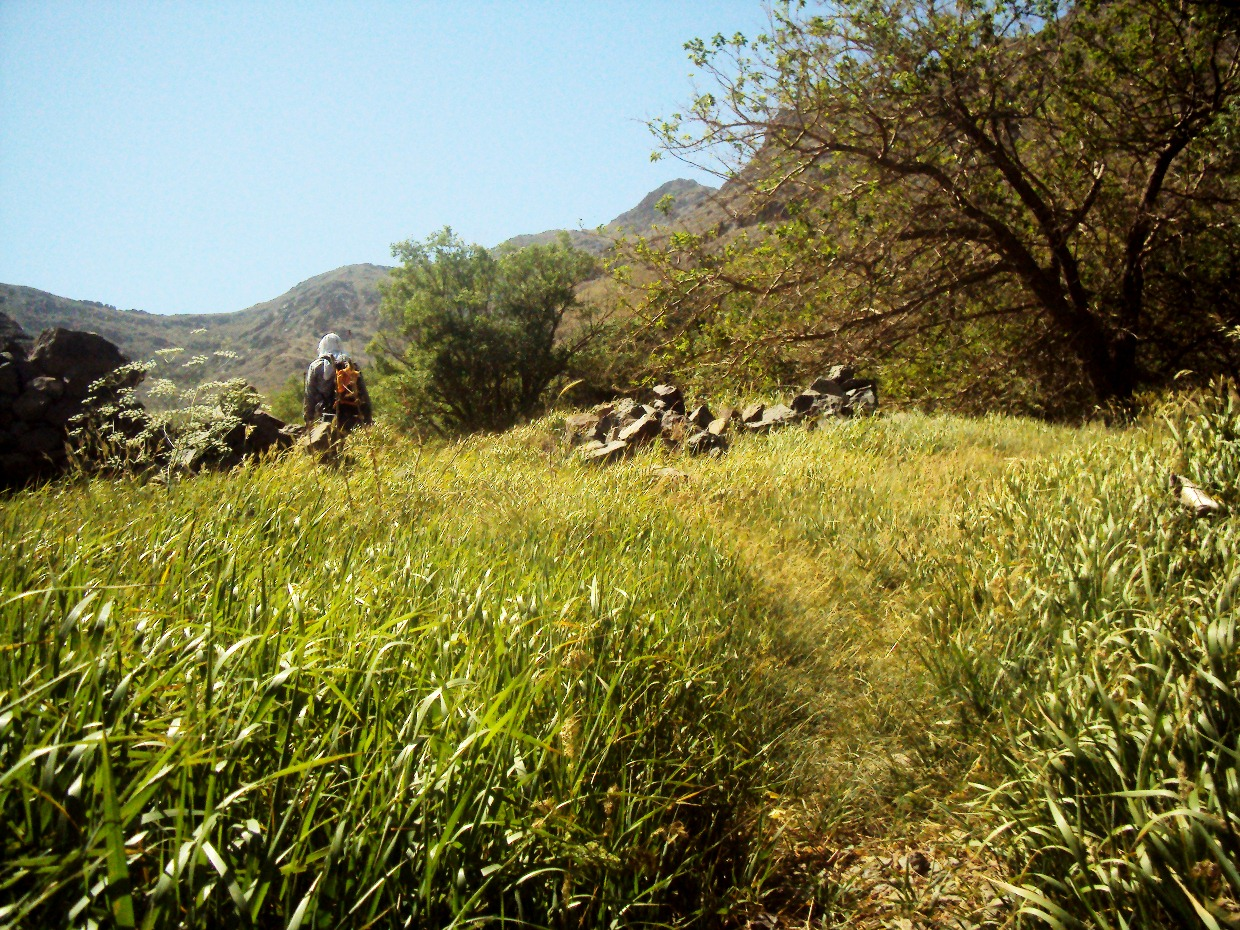
Landscape near Sanjagan

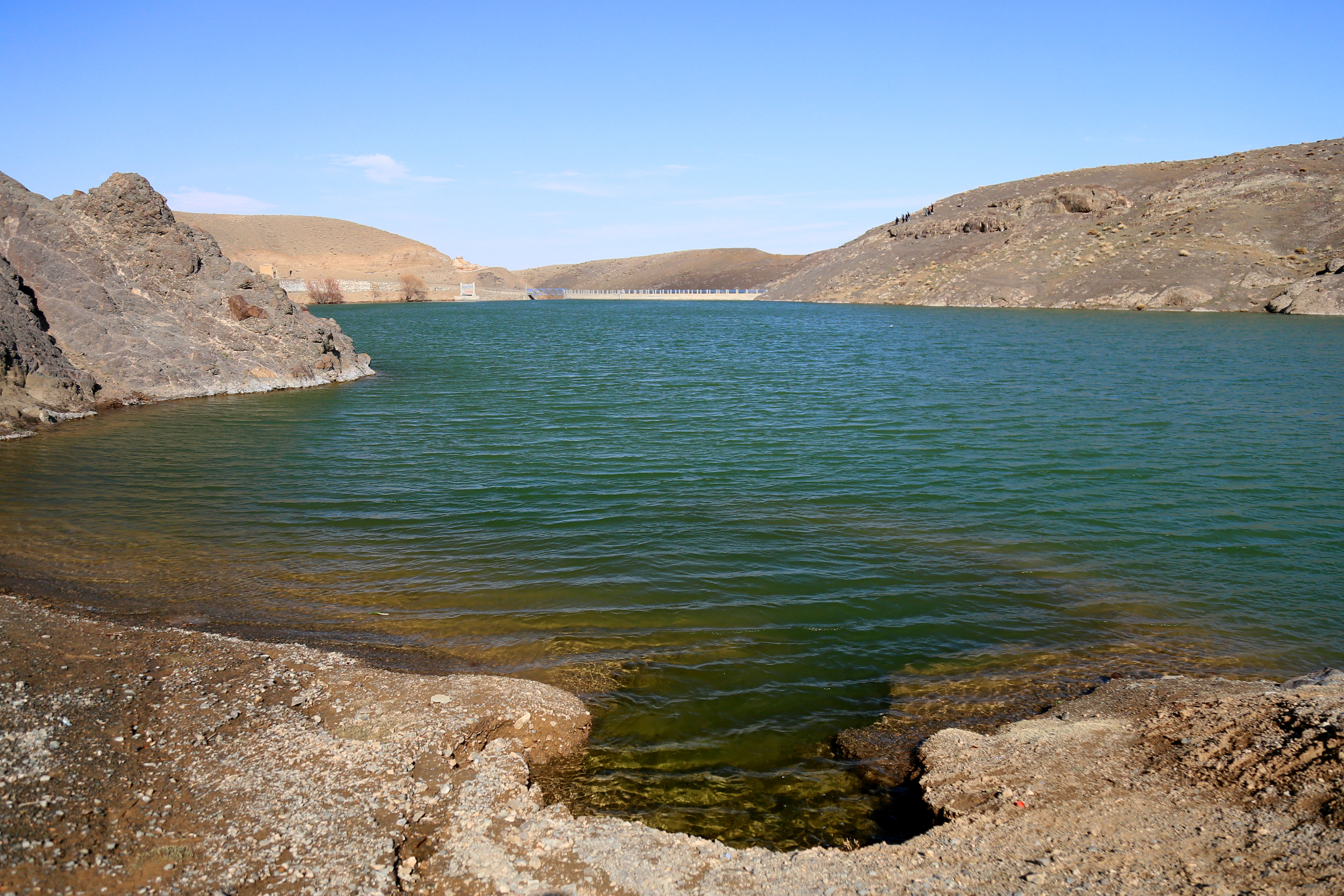
Sanjagan Dam

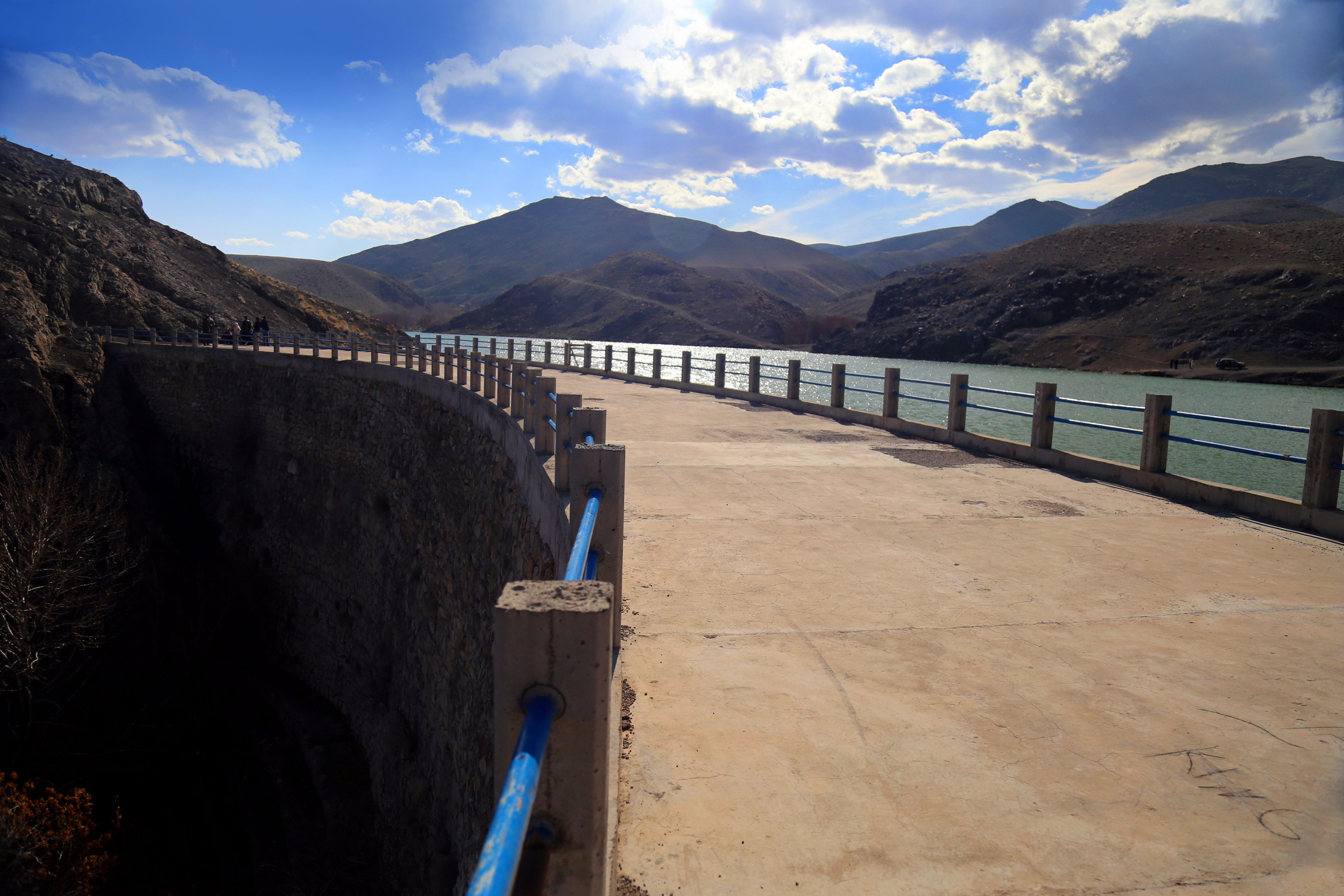
Sanjagan Dam
