= Malekabad, Qom =

Village in Qom province, Iran

Malekabad Persian: ملك اباد
- Village
- Location within Iran
- Coordinates: 34°46′08″N 51°02′59″E
- Country: Iran
- Province: Qom
- County: Qom
- District: Central
- Rural District: Qomrud

Population (2016)
  - Total: 262
- Time zone: UTC+3:30 (IRST)

Malekabad (Persian: ملك اباد) (Note: Also romanized as Malekābād; also known as Malikābād) is a village in Qomrud Rural District of the Central District in Qom County, Qom province, Iran.

== Demographics ==
=== Population ===
At the time of the 2006 National Census, the village's population was 256 in 61 households. The following census in 2011 counted 243 people in 69 households. The 2016 census measured the population of the village as 262 people in 81 households.
