= Dulay Qarqi =

Dulay Qarqi دولاي قارقي
- village
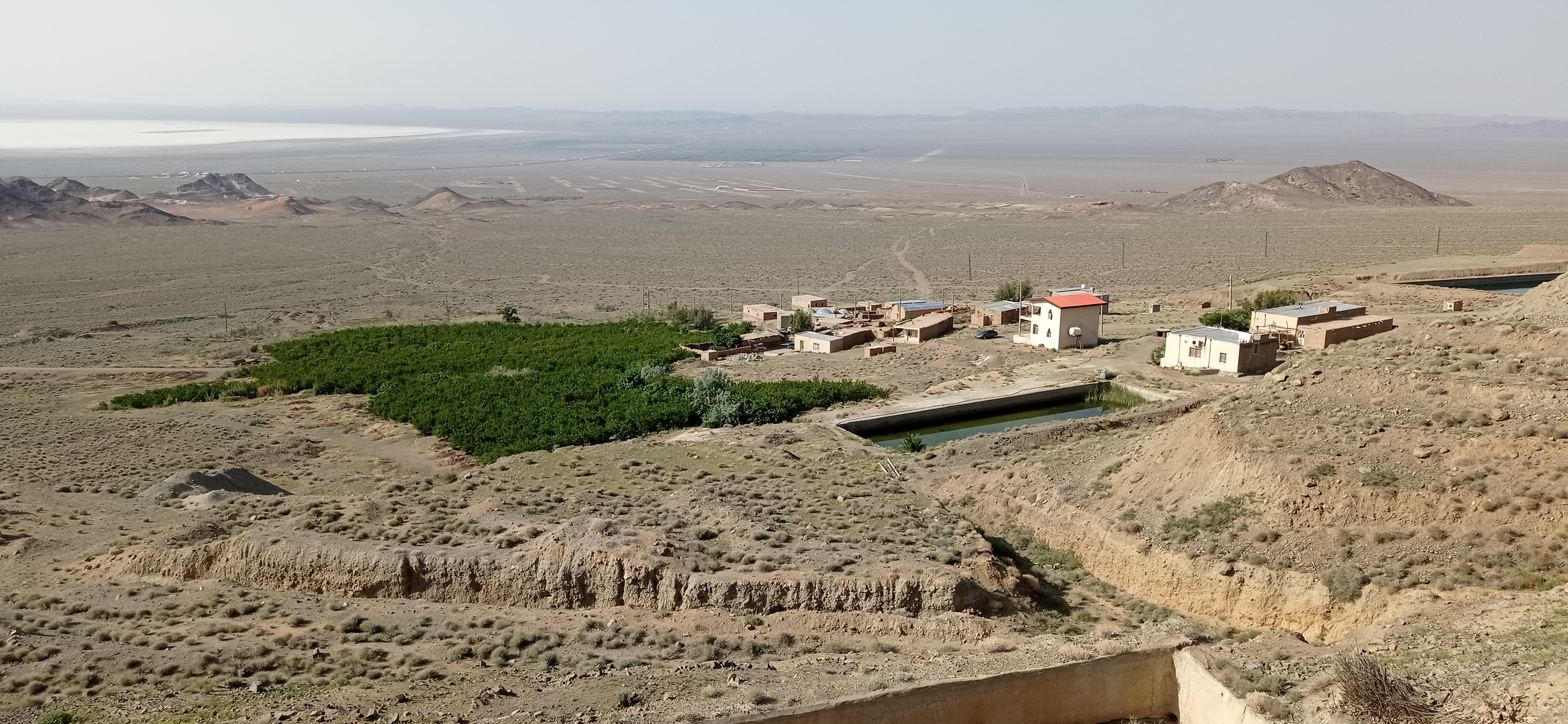

- Location within Iran
- Coordinates: 35°08′24″N 50°52′57″E
- Country: Iran
- Province: Qom
- County: Qom
- Bakhsh: Central
- Rural District: Qomrud
- Time zone: UTC+3:30 (IRST)
  - Summer (DST): UTC+4:30 (IRDT)

Dulay Qarqi (Persian: دولاي قارقي, also Romanized as Dūlāy Qārqī and Dūlā-ye Qārqī; also known as Dūlāy Qārī) is a village in Qomrud Rural District, in the Central District of Qom County, Qom Province, Iran. The 2006 Iran census noted its existence but not its population.
