= Qeshlaq-e Malek Qaleh =

Village in Qom province, Iran

Qeshlaq-e Malek Qaleh Persian: قشلاق ملك قلعه
- Village
- Location within Iran
- Coordinates: 34°45′06″N 51°00′01″E
- Country: Iran
- Province: Qom
- County: Qom
- District: Central
- Rural District: Qomrud

Population (2016)
  - Total: 201
- Time zone: UTC+3:30 (IRST)

Qeshlaq-e Malek Qaleh (Persian: قشلاق ملك قلعه) (Note: Also romanized as Qeshlāq-e Malek Qal‘eh) is a village in Qomrud Rural District of the Central District in Qom County, Qom province, Iran.

== Demographics ==
=== Population ===
At the time of the 2006 National Census, the village's population was 240 in 51 households. The following census in 2011 counted 233 people in 61 households. The 2016 census measured the population of the village as 201 people in 60 households.
