= Kondrud =

Kondrud and Gundrud and Kandrud or Kond Rud (Persian: كندرود), also rendered as Kondo Rud, may refer to:

- Kond Rud, Shabestar, East Azerbaijan Province
- Kond Rud, Tabriz, East Azerbaijan Province
- Kondrud, Qom
