= Cheshmeh Shur, Qom =

Cheshmeh Shur چشمه شور
- Village
- Location within Iran
- Coordinates: 35°05′11″N 50°59′10″E
- Country: Iran
- Province: Qom
- County: Qom
- Bakhsh: Central
- Rural District: Qomrud

Population (2006)
  - Total: 177
- Time zone: UTC+3:30 (IRST)
  - Summer (DST): UTC+4:30 (IRDT)

Cheshmeh Shur (Persian: چشمه شور, also Romanized as Cheshmeh Shūr and Cheshmeh-ye Shūr; also known as Shūr Cheshmeh and Cheshmeh Nūr) is a village in Qomrud Rural District, in the Central District of Qom County, Qom Province, Iran. At the 2006 census, its population was 177, in 42 families.
