= Majidabad, Qom =

Majidabad مجيداباد
- Village
- Location within Iran
- Coordinates: 34°19′39″N 50°31′20″E
- Country: Iran
- Province: Qom
- County: Qom
- Bakhsh: Salafchegan
- Rural District: Neyzar

Population (2006)
  - Total: 29
- Time zone: UTC+3:30 (IRST)
  - Summer (DST): UTC+4:30 (IRDT)

Majidabad (Persian: مجيداباد, also Romanized as Majīdābād) is a village in Neyzar Rural District, Salafchegan District, Qom County, Qom Province, Iran. At the 2006 census, its population was 29, in 10 families.
