= Qomrud Castle =

Castle in Qom Province, Iran

Qomrud castle
- قلعه قمرود
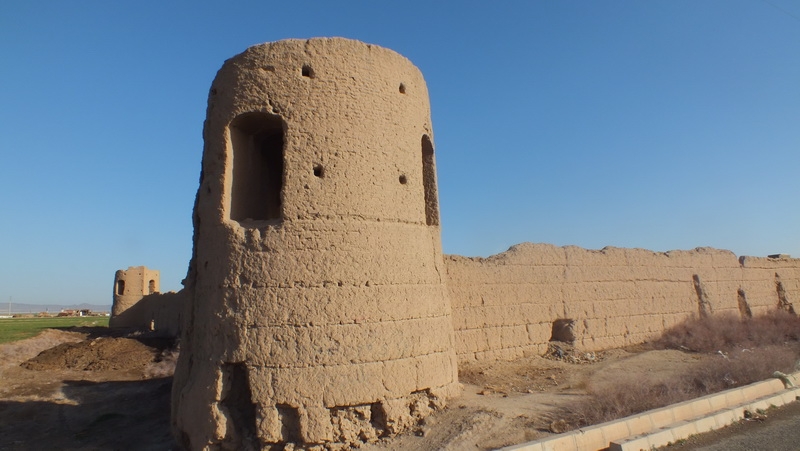
- Interactive map of the Qomrud castle area

General information
- Type: Castle
- Location: Qom County, Iran
- Coordinates: 34.72403°N 51.06778°E

Qomrud castle (Persian: قلعه قمرود) is a historical castle located in Qom County in Qom Province, The longevity of this fortress dates back to the Safavid dynasty.
