= Qarah Su, Qom =

Qarah Su قره سو
- Village
- Location within Iran
- Coordinates: 34°29′07″N 50°31′25″E
- Country: Iran
- Province: Qom
- County: Qom
- Bakhsh: Salafchegan
- Rural District: Rahjerd-e Sharqi

Population (2006)
  - Total: 15
- Time zone: UTC+3:30 (IRST)
  - Summer (DST): UTC+4:30 (IRDT)

Qarah Su (Persian: قره سو, also Romanized as Qarah Sū, Qarā Sū, and Qareh Sū; also known as Kerāshu) is a village in Rahjerd-e Sharqi Rural District, Salafchegan District, Qom County, Qom Province, Iran. At the 2006 census, its population was 15, in 5 families.
