= Samabad Castle =

Castle in Qom Province, Iran

Samabad castle
- قلعه سام‌آباد
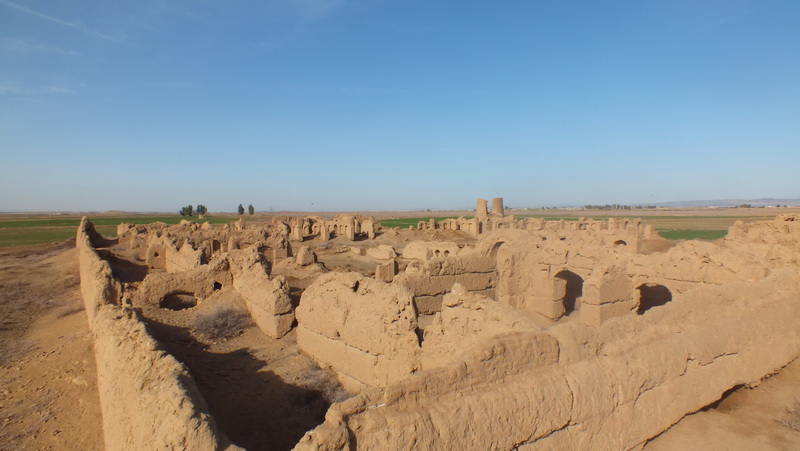
- Interactive map of the Samabad castle area

General information
- Type: Castle
- Location: Qom County, Iran

Samabad castle (Persian: قلعه سام‌آباد) is a historical castle located in Qom County in Qom Province, The longevity of this fortress dates back to the Qajar dynasty.
