= Damshahr =

Village in Qom province, Iran

Damshahr Persian: دامشهر
- Village
- Location within Iran
- Coordinates: 34°43′30″N 50°42′45″E
- Country: Iran
- Province: Qom
- County: Qom
- District: Central
- Rural District: Qomrud

Population (2016)
  - Total: 842
- Time zone: UTC+3:30 (IRST)

Damshahr (Persian: دامشهر) (Note: Also romanized as Dāmshahr; formerly known as Shahrak-e Dam (شهرك دام), also romanized as Shahraḵ-e Dām) is a village in Qomrud Rural District of the Central District in Qom County, Qom province, Iran.

== Demographics ==
=== Population ===
At the time of the 2006 National Census, the village's population, as Shahrak-e Dam, was 829 in 201 households. The following census in 2011 counted 162 people in 42 households, by which time the village was listed as Damshahr. The 2016 census measured the population of the village as 842 people in 265 households.
