= Qermez Castle =

Castle in Qom Province, Iran

Qermez castle
- قلعه قرمز
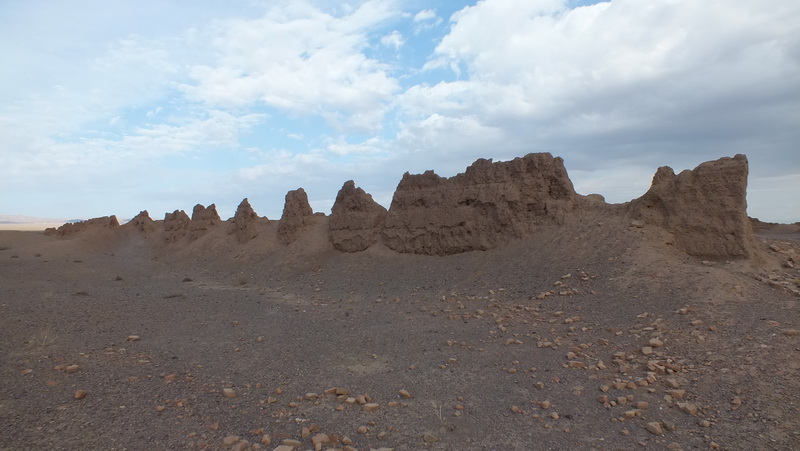

- Location within Iran

General information
- Type: Castle
- Location: Qom County, Iran
- Coordinates: 35.09681°N 51.09933°E

Qermez castle (Persian: قلعه قرمز) is a historical castle located in Qom County in Qom Province. The longevity of this fortress dates back to the Qajar dynasty.
