= Qomrud =

Village in Qom province, Iran

Qomrud Persian: قمرود
- Village
- Location within Iran
- Coordinates: 34°43′32″N 51°04′20″E
- Country: Iran
- Province: Qom
- County: Qom
- District: Central
- Rural District: Qomrud

Population (2016)
  - Total: 1,703
- Time zone: UTC+3:30 (IRST)

Qomrud (Persian: قمرود) (Note: Also romanized as Qomrūd; also known as Qumrūd) is a village in, and the capital of, Qomrud Rural District in the Central District of Qom County, Qom province, Iran.

== Demographics ==
=== Language ===
Seventy percent of the village population speaks Turkic languages, 5–10% speak Afghan languages, and 20%–25% speak Persian languages.

=== Population ===
At the time of the 2006 National Census, the village's population was 1,922 in 443 households. The following census in 2011 counted 1,882 people in 481 households. The 2016 census measured the population of the village as 1,703 people in 493 households. It was the most populous village in its rural district.

== Overview ==
In general, the Qomrud area is one of the most densely populated regions in the world and a transportation hub for humans during the BCE period. It features various historical monuments from different eras, including the Qarat-e-Tappeh (قره تپه) Qomrud, which serves as evidence of this rich history.

Large areas of Iran are home to ancient civilizations, and the Qomrud area has preserved elements from the early days of civilization. The first ancient prayers on the Iranian plateau were conducted in this area. Some historians attribute the original construction of this region to figures such as Alexander, Bahram Gur, Tahmurth, Lhrassap, Kavad I, Yazdgerd III, and others, although there is considerable debate surrounding these claims.

Archaeologists like Roman Cirsman regard Qom as one of the oldest regions where humans have settled and established early civilizations. Recent archaeological findings suggest that the Qomrud region dates back more than 7,000 years. Researchers assert that the presence of Qomrud (Qom River) and its proximity to the Silk Road have made this area a cradle of civilization since the dawn of history. Approximately 130 ancient sites, primarily from the Sassanid and Parthian eras, have been identified in the region.

== Economy ==
The job of the people of Qomrud Rural District is often agricultural and part of the population is also engaged in animal husbandry. This rural district is one of the most important agricultural and livestock fields of Qom province. In the past, a large part of agricultural agriculture in this village was provided by qanats and Qomrud. Over the passage of time and rainfall reduction, and by the construction of the dam of 15 Khordad to the south of the river, farmers have been stopped by the river and today they are supplied with agricultural aquifers.

The products of this village are often barley and alfalfa, but in recent decades pistachio planting has grown strongly in this village, and most farmers have turned to gardening with drought-resistant trees. Over the past few years wheat has been cultivated almost entirely out of the agricultural industry of this village.

In recent years, women in this village have turned to home-based businesses, which have become widespread in the Qomrud region.
