= Sariyeh Khatun =

Sariyeh Khatun ساريه خاتون
- Village
- Location within Iran
- Coordinates: 34°13′03″N 50°31′38″E
- Country: Iran
- Province: Qom
- County: Qom
- Bakhsh: Salafchegan
- Rural District: Neyzar

Population (2006)
  - Total: 85
- Time zone: UTC+3:30 (IRST)
  - Summer (DST): UTC+4:30 (IRDT)

Sariyeh Khatun (Persian: ساريه خاتون, also Romanized as Sārīyeh Khātūn; also known as Emāmzādeh, Emāmzādeh Sārīyeh Khātūn, and Imāmzādeh) is a village in Neyzar Rural District, Salafchegan District, Qom County, Qom Province, Iran. At the 2006 census, its population was 85, in 25 families.
