= Qazi-ye Bala =

Qazi-ye Bala قاضي بالا
- Village
- Location within Iran
- Coordinates: 34°32′21″N 50°28′50″E
- Country: Iran
- Province: Qom
- County: Qom
- Bakhsh: Salafchegan
- Rural District: Rahjerd-e Sharqi

Population (2006)
  - Total: 95
- Time zone: UTC+3:30 (IRST)
  - Summer (DST): UTC+4:30 (IRDT)

Qazi-ye Bala (Persian: قاضي بالا, also Romanized as Qāzī-ye Bālā and Qāzī Bālā; also known as Qāẕī-ye ‘Olyā and Qāzī-ye ‘Olyā) is a village in Rahjerd-e Sharqi Rural District, Salafchegan District, Qom County, Qom Province, Iran. At the 2006 census, its population was 95, in 28 families.
