= Kuh Sefid, Qom =

Village in Qom province, Iran

Kuh Sefid Persian: كوه سفيد
- Village
- Location within Iran
- Coordinates: 34°47′51″N 51°11′06″E
- Country: Iran
- Province: Qom
- County: Qom
- District: Central
- Rural District: Qomrud

Population (2016)
  - Total: 526
- Time zone: UTC+3:30 (IRST)

Kuh Sefid (Persian: كوه سفيد) (Note: Also romanized as Kūh Safīd, Kūh Sefīd, and Kūh-e Sefīd; also known as Safīdkūh) is a village in Qomrud Rural District of the Central District in Qom County, Qom province, Iran.

== Demographics ==
=== Population ===
At the time of the 2006 National Census, the village's population was 333 in 75 households. The following census in 2011 counted 417 people in 116 households. The 2016 census measured the population of the village as 526 people in 145 households.
