= Zar Bolagh Castle =

Castle in Qom Province, Iran

Zar Bolagh castle
- قلعه زاربلاغ
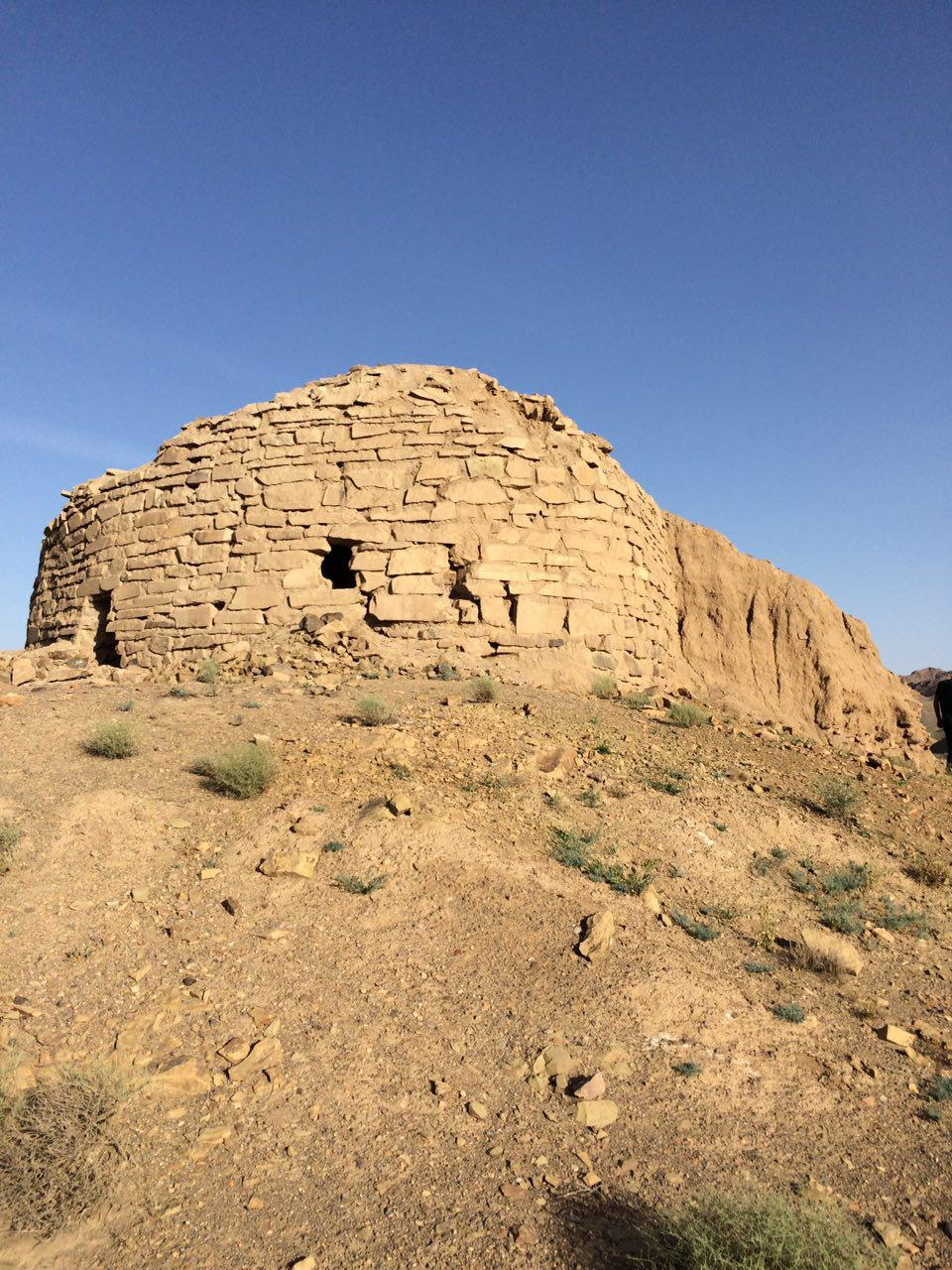
- Interactive map of the Zar Bolagh castle area

General information
- Type: Castle
- Location: Qom County, Iran
- Coordinates: 35.1701°N 50.9674°E

Zar Bolagh castle (Persian: قلعه زاربلاغ) is a historical castle located in Qom County in Qom province, The longevity of this fortress dates back to the Medes.
