= Chehel Akhtaran Mosque =

Shi'ite mosque in Qom, Iran

- مسجد چهل اختران
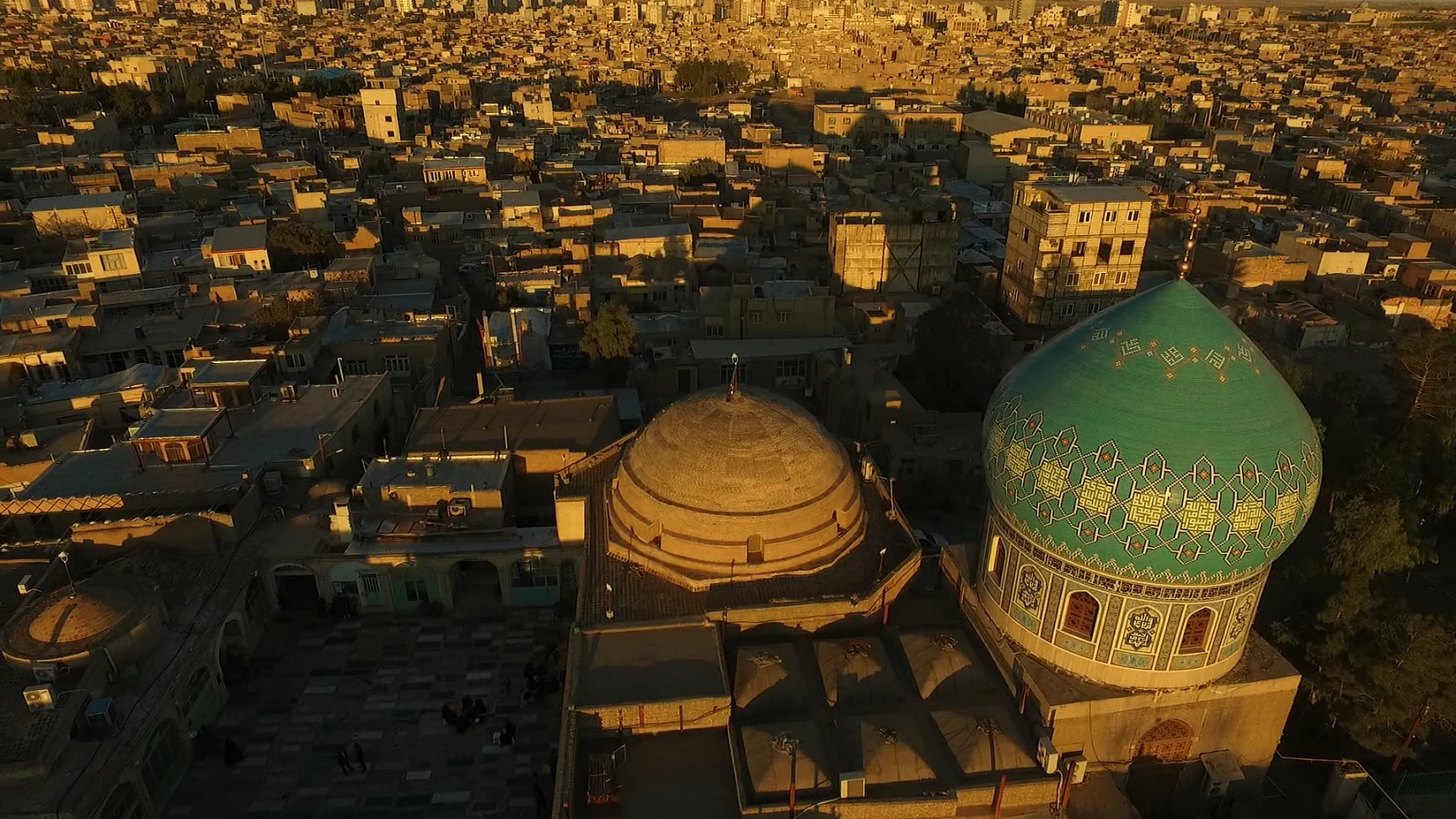
- The mosque in 2015

- Location of the mosque in Iran

Religion
- Affiliation: Shia Islam
- Ecclesiastical or organizational status: Mosque
- Status: Active

Location
- Location: Chehel Akhtaran Complex, Qom County, Qom Province
- Country: Iran
- Interactive map of Chehel Akhtaran Mosque
- Coordinates: 28°44′52″N 54°32′32″E

Architecture
- Type: Mosque architecture
- Style: Qajar
- Completed: Qajar dynasty

Specifications
- Dome: Two (maybe more)
- Materials: Stone; bricks; plaster; tiles

Iran National Heritage List
- Official name: Chehel Akhtaran Mosque
- Type: Built
- Designated: 6 September 2004
- Part of: Chehel Akhtaran Complex
- Reference no.: 11100
- Conservation organization: Cultural Heritage, Handicrafts and Tourism Organization of Iran

The Chehel Akhtaran Mosque (Persian: مسجد چهل اختران; Arabic: مسجد أربعون أختران) is a Shi'ite Friday mosque, part of the Chehel Akhtaran Complex, located in the county of Qom, in the province of Qom, Iran. The mosque was built in the 20th century, during the Qajar era.

The mosque was added to the Iran National Heritage List on 6 September 2004, administered by the Cultural Heritage, Handicrafts and Tourism Organization of Iran.

The Chehel Akhtaran Complex, added to the Iran National Heritage List on 29 December 1973, includes the mosque and three Imamzadehs in honor of Chehel Akhtaran, Musa al-Mubarqa, and Zeid respectively.

== See also ==
- Shia Islam in Iran
- List of mosques in Iran
