= Chal Gonbad =

Chal Gonbad چال گنبد
- Village
- Location within Iran
- Coordinates: 34°21′01″N 50°40′41″E
- Country: Iran
- Province: Qom
- County: Qom
- Bakhsh: Salafchegan
- Rural District: Neyzar

Population (2006)
  - Total: 238
- Time zone: UTC+3:30 (IRST)
  - Summer (DST): UTC+4:30 (IRDT)

Chal Gonbad (Persian: چال گنبد, also Romanized as Chāl Gonbad; also known as Chāleh Gonbad and Chāleh Gunbad) is a village in Neyzar Rural District, Salafchegan District, Qom County, Qom Province, Iran. At the 2006 census, its population was 238, in 66 families.
