= Dulay (surname) =

Dulay or Duley is a surname, that may refer to:

- Don Dulay (born 1980), Filipino basketball player
- Giles Duley (born 1971), British photographer
- Lang Dulay
- Larry Dulay Itliong (1913–1977), American labor leader
- Margaret Duley (1894–1968), Canadian writer
- Orlando Dulay
- Thor Dulay (born 1980), Filipino singer

== See also ==
- Duley (caste)
- Dulay Qarqi, a village in Iran
