= Yekeh Bagh =

Yekeh Bagh or Yekkehbagh or Yekkeh Bagh or Yakkeh Bagh (Persian: يكه باغ) may refer to:

- Yekeh Bagh, Markazi
- Yekeh Bagh, Qom
- Yekkehbagh, Dargaz, Razavi Khorasan Province
- Yekkeh Bagh, Torbat-e Jam, Razavi Khorasan Province
