= Cheshmeh Shur =

Cheshmeh Shur or Chashmeh Shur or Cheshmeh-ye Shur (Persian: چشمه شور) may refer to:

- Cheshmeh Shur, Qom Iran
- Cheshmeh Shur, Razavi Khorasan, Iran
