= Anayit Beyk =

Village in Qom province, Iran

Anayit Beyk Persian: عنايت بيك
- Village
- Location within Iran
- Coordinates: 34°29′00″N 50°28′50″E
- Country: Iran
- Province: Qom
- County: Qom
- District: Salafchegan
- Rural District: Rahjerd-e Sharqi

Population (2016)
  - Total: 251
- Time zone: UTC+3:30 (IRST)

Anayit Beyk (Persian: عنايت بيك) (Note: Also romanized as ʿAnyāīt Beyḵ) is a village in Rahjerd-e Sharqi Rural District of Salafchegan District in Qom County, Qom province, Iran.

== Demographics ==
=== Population ===
At the time of the 2006 National Census, the village's population was 152 in 50 households. The following census in 2011 counted 167 people in 59 households. The 2016 census measured the population of the village as 251 people in 92 households.
