= Khorramabad, Qom =

Khorramabad خرم اباد
- Village
- Location within Iran
- Coordinates: 34°24′58″N 50°32′16″E
- Country: Iran
- Province: Qom
- County: Qom
- Bakhsh: Salafchegan
- Rural District: Neyzar

Population (2006)
  - Total: 86
- Time zone: UTC+3:30 (IRST)
  - Summer (DST): UTC+4:30 (IRDT)

Khorramabad (Persian: خرم اباد, also Romanized as Khorramābād) is a village in Neyzar Rural District, Salafchegan District, Qom County, Qom Province, Iran. At the 2006 census, its population was 86, in 26 families.
