= Jondab, Qom =

Village in Qom province, Iran

Jondab Persian: جنداب
- Village
- Location within Iran
- Coordinates: 34°31′23″N 50°29′46″E
- Country: Iran
- Province: Qom
- County: Qom
- District: Salafchegan
- Rural District: Rahjerd-e Sharqi

Population (2016)
  - Total: 1,403
- Time zone: UTC+3:30 (IRST)

Jondab (Persian: جنداب) (Note: Also romanized as Jandāb and Jondāb; also known as Khandāb and Khund Āb) is a village in Rahjerd-e Sharqi Rural District of Salafchegan District in Qom County, Qom province, Iran.

== Demographics ==
=== Population ===
At the time of the 2006 National Census, the village's population was 1,261 in 366 households. The following census in 2011 counted 1,307 people in 399 households. The 2016 census measured the population of the village as 1,403 people in 447 households, the most populous in its rural district.
