= Mohammadabad, Qomrud =

Village in Qom province, Iran

Mohammadabad Persian: محمّدآباد
- Village
- Location within Iran
- Coordinates: 34°49′54″N 51°08′35″E
- Country: Iran
- Province: Qom
- County: Qom
- District: Central
- Rural District: Qomrud

Population (2016)
  - Total: 0
- Time zone: UTC+3:30 (IRST)

Mohammadabad (Persian: محمّدآباد) (Note: Also romanized as Moḩammadābād, Moḩamadābād , and Muhammadābād) is a village in Qomrud Rural District of the Central District in Qom County, Qom province, Iran.

== Population ==
At the time of the 2006 National Census, the village's population was 100 in 12 households. The 2016 census measured the population of the village as zero.
