= Hasanabad, Khalajestan =

Hasanabad حسن اباد
- Village
- Location within Iran
- Coordinates: 34°34′51″N 50°20′16″E
- Country: Iran
- Province: Qom
- County: Qom
- Bakhsh: Khalajestan
- Rural District: Dastjerd

Population (2006)
  - Total: 66
- Time zone: UTC+3:30 (IRST)
  - Summer (DST): UTC+4:30 (IRDT)

Hasanabad (Persian: حسن اباد, also Romanized as Ḩasanābād) is a village in Dastjerd Rural District, Khalajestan District, Qom County, Qom Province, Iran. As of the 2006 census, its population was 66, in 22 families.
