= Maqbulabad =

Maqbulabad مقبول اباد
- Village
- Location within Iran
- Coordinates: 34°35′23″N 50°16′35″E
- Country: Iran
- Province: Qom
- County: Qom
- Bakhsh: Khalajestan
- Rural District: Dastjerd

Population (2006)
  - Total: 21
- Time zone: UTC+3:30 (IRST)
  - Summer (DST): UTC+4:30 (IRDT)

Maqbulabad (Persian: مقبول اباد, also Romanized as Maqbūlābād) is a village in Dastjerd Rural District, Khalajestan District, Qom County, Qom Province, Iran. At the 2006 census, its population was 21, in 5 families.
