= Sefidaleh =

Sefidaleh سفيداله
- Village
- Location within Iran
- Coordinates: 34°36′19″N 50°21′30″E
- Country: Iran
- Province: Qom
- County: Qom
- Bakhsh: Khalajestan
- Rural District: Dastjerd

Population (2016)
  - Total: 53
- Time zone: UTC+3:30 (IRST)
  - Summer (DST): UTC+4:30 (IRDT)
- Area code: 0253

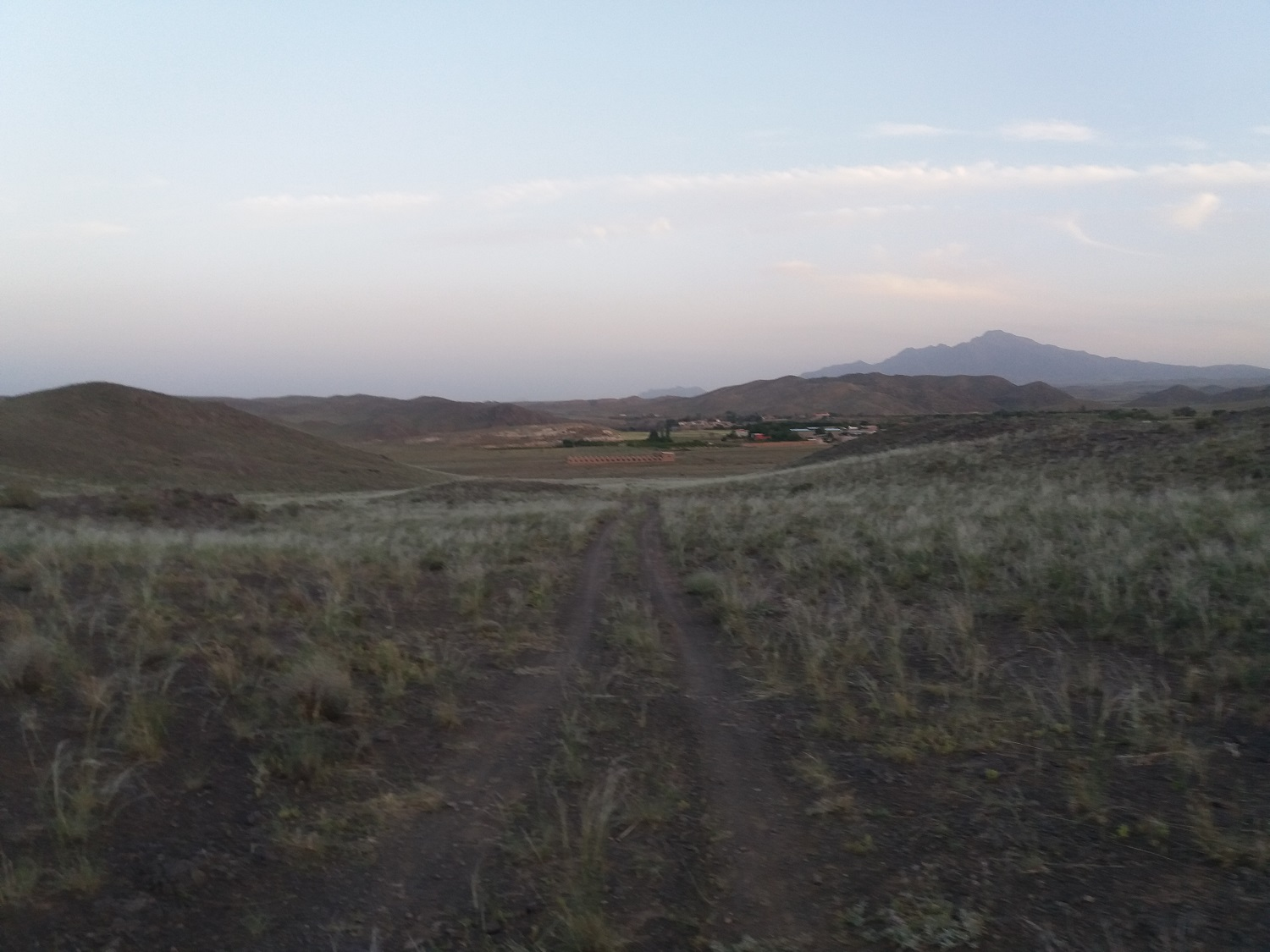

Sefidaleh (Persian: سفيداله, also Romanized as Sefīdāleh) is a village in Dastjerd Rural District, Khalajestan District, Qom County, Qom Province, Iran. At the 2016 census, its population was 53, in 20 families. Most fruits of the village are pomegranates. But along with those fruits like blackberries and walnuts are also found. Villagers are engaged in construction and agriculture in the countryside.

The weather in the village is hot and dry in the summer, but it has a cool winter and a beautiful spring.

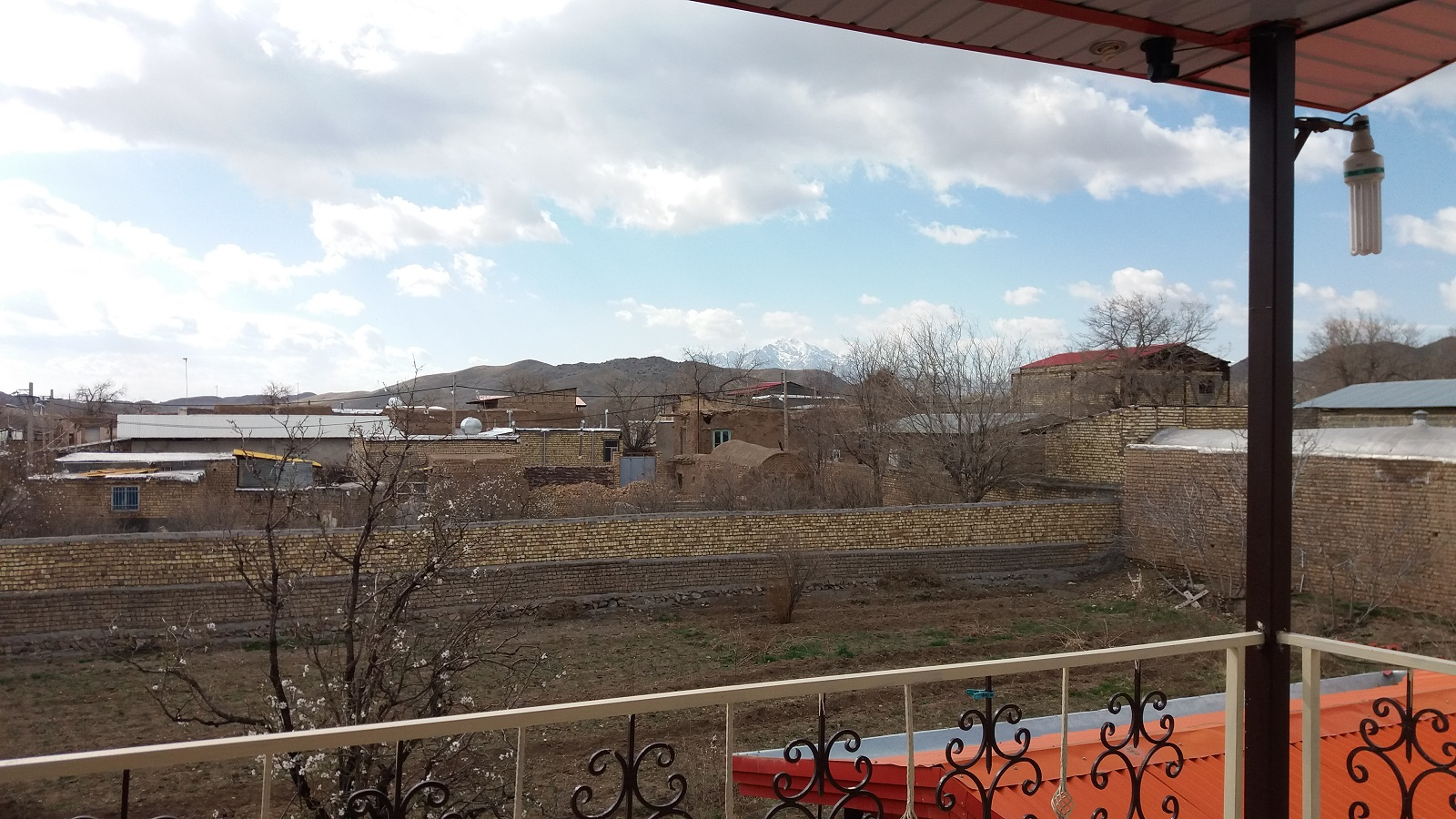
خانه های قدیمی روستا

Sefidaleh

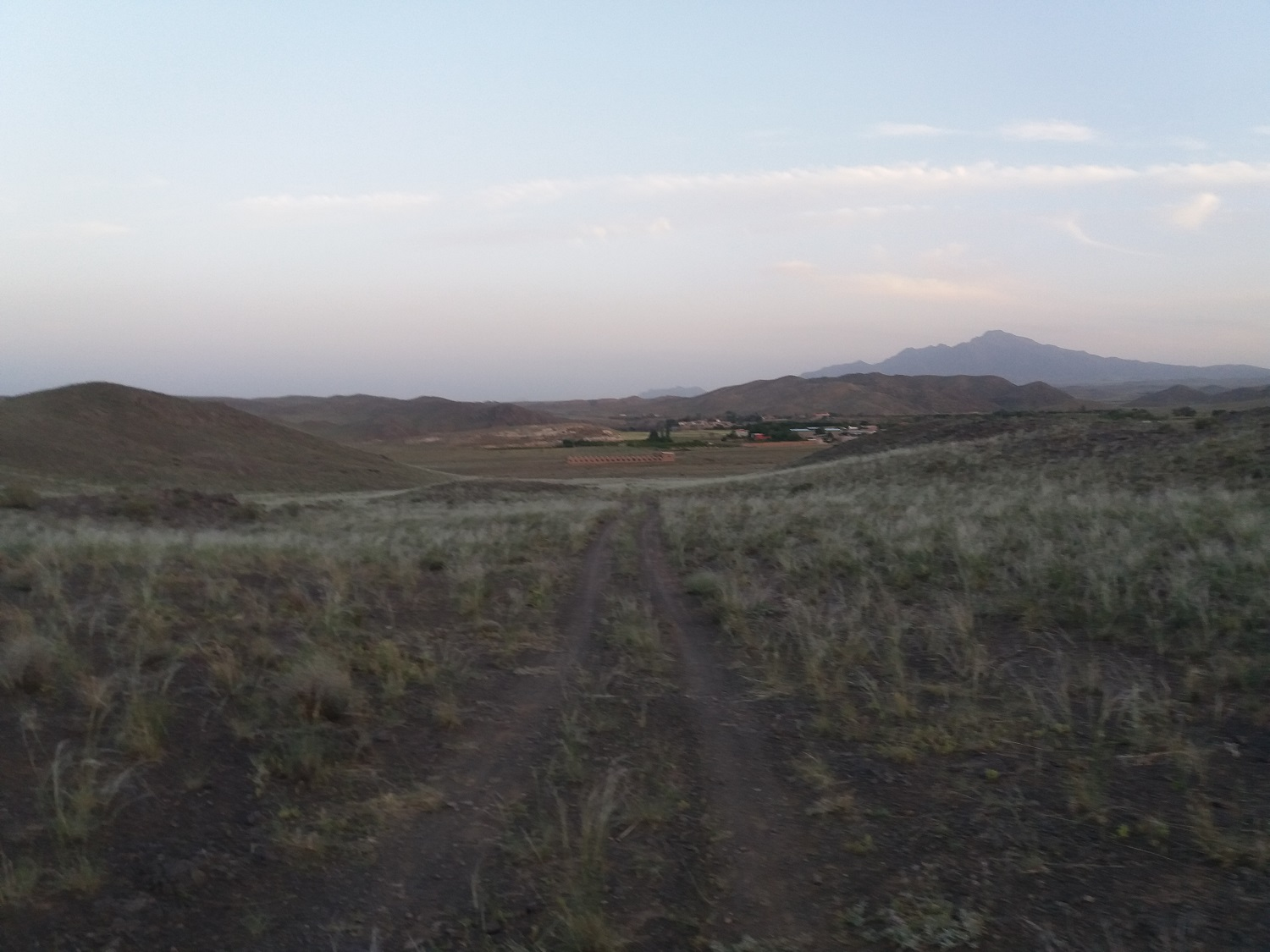
File:روستای_سفیداله.jpg

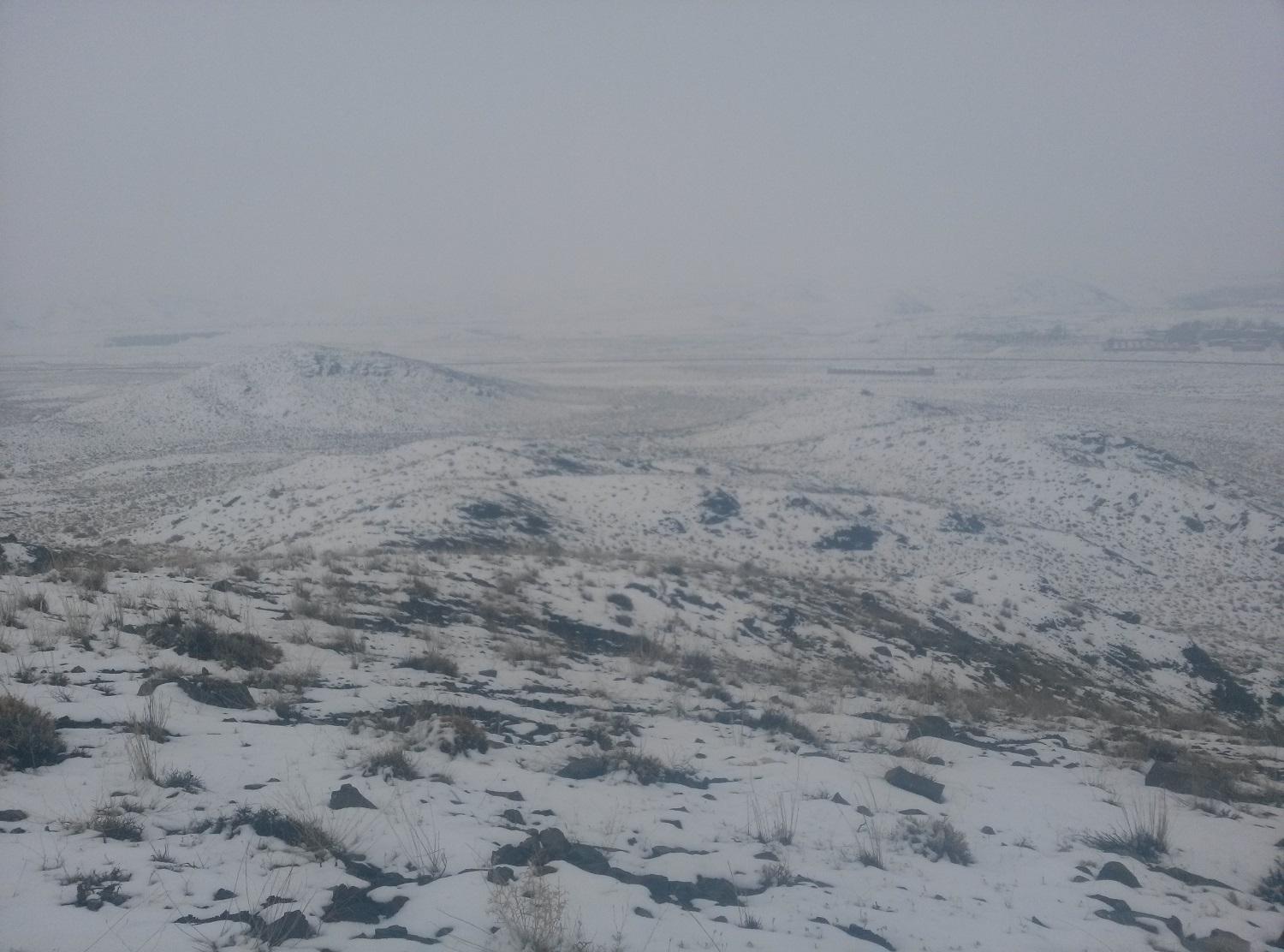
File:زمستان_روستای_سفیداله.jpg

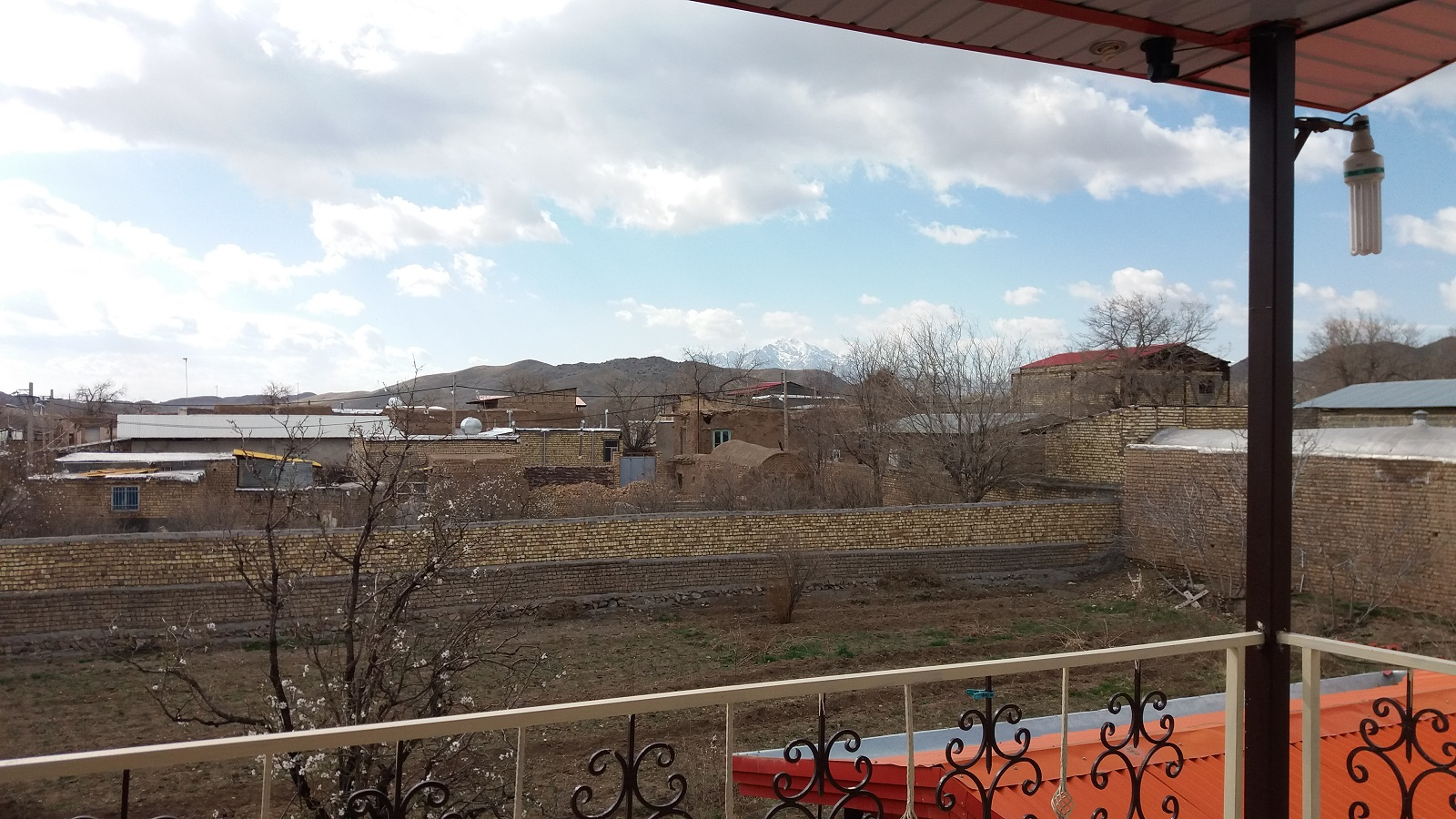
File:خانه_های_قدیمی_روستا_سفیداله.jpg
