= Seft =

Seft سفت
- Village
- Location within Iran
- Coordinates: 34°37′15″N 50°22′48″E
- Country: Iran
- Province: Qom
- County: Qom
- Bakhsh: Khalajestan
- Rural District: Dastjerd

Population (2006)
  - Total: 67
- Time zone: UTC+3:30 (IRST)
  - Summer (DST): UTC+4:30 (IRDT)

Seft (Persian: سفت) is a village in Dastjerd Rural District, Khalajestan District, Qom County, Qom Province, Iran. At the 2005 census, its population was 67, in 25 families.
