= Dowlatabad, Salafchegan =

Dowlatabad دولت اباد
- Village
- Location within Iran
- Coordinates: 34°12′59″N 50°30′31″E
- Country: Iran
- Province: Qom
- County: Qom
- Bakhsh: Salafchegan
- Rural District: Neyzar

Population (2006)
  - Total: 103
- Time zone: UTC+3:30 (IRST)
  - Summer (DST): UTC+4:30 (IRDT)

Dowlatabad (Persian: دولت اباد, also Romanized as Dowlatābād and Daulatābād) is a village in Neyzar Rural District, Salafchegan District, Qom County, Qom Province, Iran. At the 2006 census, its population was 103, in 42 families.
