= Sanavand =

Sanavand سناوند
- Village
- Location within Iran
- Coordinates: 34°34′14″N 50°19′23″E
- Country: Iran
- Province: Qom
- County: Qom
- Bakhsh: Khalajestan
- Rural District: Dastjerd

Population (2006)
  - Total: 126
- Time zone: UTC+3:30 (IRST)
  - Summer (DST): UTC+4:30 (IRDT)

Sanavand (Persian: سناوند, also Romanized as Sanāvand) is a village in Dastjerd Rural District, Khalajestan District, Qom County, Qom Province, Iran. At the 2006 census, its population was 126, in 45 families.
