= Rahjerd, Qom =

Village in Qom province, Iran

Rahjerd Persian: راهجرد
- Village
- Location within Iran
- Coordinates: 34°23′02″N 50°22′08″E
- Country: Iran
- Province: Qom
- County: Qom
- District: Salafchegan
- Rural District: Rahjerd-e Sharqi

Population (2016)
  - Total: 335
- Time zone: UTC+3:30 (IRST)

Rahjerd (Persian: راهجرد) (Note: Also romanized as Rāhjerd; also known as Rāh Gerd and Rāhgīrd) is a village in Rahjerd-e Sharqi Rural District of Salafchegan District in Qom County, Qom province, Iran.

== Demographics ==
=== Population ===
At the time of the 2006 National Census, the village's population was 335 in 120 households. The following census in 2011 counted 250 people in 92 households. The 2016 census measured the population of the village as 335 people in 120 households.
