= Dowlatabad-e Aqa =

Village in Qom province, Iran

Dowlatabad-e Aqa Persian: دولت اباداقا
- Village
- Location within Iran
- Coordinates: 34°37′47″N 51°07′26″E
- Country: Iran
- Province: Qom
- County: Qom
- District: Central
- Rural District: Qanavat

Population (2016)
  - Total: 182
- Time zone: UTC+3:30 (IRST)

Dowlatabad-e Aqa (Persian: دولت اباداقا) (Note: Also romanized as Dowlatābād-e Āqā; also known as Daulatābād and Dowlatābād) is a village in Qanavat Rural District of the Central District in Qom County, Qom province, Iran.

== Demographics ==
=== Population ===
At the time of the 2006 National Census, the village's population was 184 in 47 households. The following census in 2011 counted 195 people in 57 households. The 2016 census measured the population of the village as 182 people in 50 households.
