= Rastehgan =

Rastehgan رستگان
- Village
- Location within Iran
- Coordinates: 34°33′31″N 50°09′44″E
- Country: Iran
- Province: Qom
- County: Qom
- Bakhsh: Khalajestan
- Rural District: Dastjerd

Population (2006)
  - Total: 141
- Time zone: UTC+3:30 (IRST)
  - Summer (DST): UTC+4:30 (IRDT)

Rastehgan (Persian: رستگان, also Romanized as Rastehgān and Rastegān) is a village in Dastjerd Rural District, Khalajestan District, Qom County, Qom Province, Iran. At the 2006 census, its population was 141, in 65 families.
