= Hesar-e Sorkh, Qom =

Hesar-e Sorkh منطقه حصارسرخ
- Village
- Location within Iran
- Coordinates: 34°20′30″N 50°31′09″E
- Country: Iran
- Province: Qom
- County: Qom
- Bakhsh: Salafchegan
- Rural District: Neyzar

Population (2006)
  - Total: 161
- Time zone: UTC+3:30 (IRST)
  - Summer (DST): UTC+4:30 (IRDT)

Hesar-e Sorkh (Persian: حصارسرخ, also Romanized as Ḩeşār-e Sorkh, Ḩeşār Sorkh, and Hisār Surkh) is a village in Neyzar Rural District, Salafchegan District, Qom County, Qom Province, Iran. At the 2006 census, its population was 161, in 38 families.
