= Yekeh Bagh, Qom =

Village in Qom province, Iran

Yekeh Bagh Persian: يكه باغ
- Village
- Location within Iran
- Coordinates: 34°30′59″N 50°22′01″E
- Country: Iran
- Province: Qom
- County: Qom
- District: Salafchegan
- Rural District: Rahjerd-e Sharqi

Population (2016)
  - Total: 280
- Time zone: UTC+3:30 (IRST)

Yekeh Bagh (Persian: يكه باغ) (Note: Also romanized as Yekeh Bāgh) is a village in Rahjerd-e Sharqi Rural District of Salafchegan District in Qom County, Qom province, Iran.

== Demographics ==
=== Population ===
At the time of the 2006 National Census, the village's population was 398 in 122 households. The following census in 2011 counted 328 people in 106 households. The 2016 census measured the population of the village as 280 people in 99 households.
