= Jerik Aghaj =

Jerik Aghaj جريك اغاج
- Village
- Location within Iran
- Coordinates: 34°29′10″N 50°09′41″E
- Country: Iran
- Province: Qom
- County: Qom
- Bakhsh: Khalajestan
- Rural District: Dastjerd

Population (2006)
  - Total: 106
- Time zone: UTC+3:30 (IRST)
  - Summer (DST): UTC+4:30 (IRDT)

Jerik Aghaj (Persian: جريك اغاج, also Romanized as Jerīk Āghāj; also known as Jerīk Āghājī) is a village in Dastjerd Rural District, Khalajestan District, Qom County, Qom Province, Iran. At the 2006 census, its population was 106, in 29 families.
