= Qashqa Bolagh-e Sofla =

Qashqa Bolagh-e Sofla قاشقابلاغ سفلي
- Village
- Location within Iran
- Coordinates: 39°02′27″N 44°17′32″E
- Country: Iran
- Province: West Azerbaijan
- County: Chaldoran
- Bakhsh: Central
- Rural District: Chaldoran-e Jonubi

Population (2006)
  - Total: 122
- Time zone: UTC+3:30 (IRST)
  - Summer (DST): UTC+4:30 (IRDT)

Qashqa Bolagh-e Sofla (Persian: قاشقابلاغ سفلي, also Romanized as Qāshqā Bolāgh-e Soflá) is a village in Chaldoran-e Jonubi Rural District, in the Central District of Chaldoran County, West Azerbaijan Province, Iran. At the 2006 census, its population was 122, in 22 families.
