= Qanavat =

City in Qom province, Iran

Qanavat Persian: قنوات
- City
- Location within Iran
- Coordinates: 34°36′39″N 51°01′24″E
- Country: Iran
- Province: Qom
- County: Qom
- District: Central

Population (2016)
  - Total: 11,667
- Time zone: UTC+3:30 (IRST)

Qanavat (Persian: قنوات) (Note: Also romanized as Qanavāt) is a city in the Central District of Qom County, Qom province, Iran. It lies off Road 7, roughly 10 kilometres southeast of Qom.

== Demographics ==
=== Population ===
At the time of the 2006 National Census, the city's population was 7,693 in 1,887 households. The following census in 2011 counted 9,662 people in 2,634 households. The 2016 census measured the population of the city as 11,667 people in 3,360 households.
