= Hesar-e Sorkh, Fariman =

Hesar-e Sorkh حصارسرخ
- Village
- Location within Iran
- Coordinates: 35°53′01″N 59°38′45″E
- Country: Iran
- Province: Razavi Khorasan
- County: Fariman
- Bakhsh: Central
- Rural District: Sang Bast

Population (2006)
  - Total: 185
- Time zone: UTC+3:30 (IRST)
  - Summer (DST): UTC+4:30 (IRDT)

Hesar-e Sorkh (Persian: حصارسرخ, also Romanized as Ḩeşār-e Sorkh) is a village in Sang Bast Rural District, in the Central District of Fariman County, Razavi Khorasan Province, Iran. At the 2006 census, its population was 185, in 45 families.
