= Kondrud, Qom =

Kondrud كندرود
- Village
- Location within Iran
- Coordinates: 34°36′09″N 50°19′09″E
- Country: Iran
- Province: Qom
- County: Qom
- Bakhsh: Khalajestan
- Rural District: Dastjerd

Population (2006)
  - Total: 189
- Time zone: UTC+3:30 (IRST)
  - Summer (DST): UTC+4:30 (IRDT)

Kondrud (Persian: كندرود, also Romanized as Kondrūd, Gūndrūd, and Kandrūd) is a village in Dastjerd Rural District, Khalajestan District, Qom County, Qom Province, Iran. At the 2006 census, its population was 189, in 72 families.
