= Salafchegan =

City in Qom province, Iran

Salafchegan Persian: سلفچگان
- City
- Location within Iran
- Coordinates: 34°28′43″N 50°27′23″E
- Country: Iran
- Province: Qom
- County: Qom
- District: Salafchegan
- Established as a city: 2008

Population (2016)
  - Total: 1,390
- Time zone: UTC+3:30 (IRST)

Salafchegan (Persian: سلفچگان) (Note: Also romanized as Salafchagan; also known as Salafcheqān, Sarafchekān, Sarafjagān, and Sarafjakan) is a city in, and the capital of, Salafchegan District in Qom County, Qom province, Iran. It also serves as the administrative center for Rahjerd-e Sharqi Rural District.

== Demographics ==
=== Population ===
At the time of the 2006 National Census, Salafchegan's population was 707 in 211 households, when it was a village in Rahjerd-e Sharqi Rural District. The following census in 2011 counted 730 people in 232 households, by which time the village had been converted to a city. The 2016 census measured the population of the city as 1,390 people in 449 households.
