= Qaziabad, Dorud =

Qaziabad قاضي آباد
- Village
- Location within Iran
- Coordinates: 33°39′13″N 48°58′07″E
- Country: Iran
- Province: Lorestan
- County: Dorud
- Bakhsh: Silakhor
- Rural District: Silakhor

Population (2006)
  - Total: 37
- Time zone: UTC+3:30 (IRST)
  - Summer (DST): UTC+4:30 (IRDT)

Qaziabad (Persian: قاضي آباد, also Romanized as Qāẕīābād and Qāzīābād; also known as Qāẕī) is a village in Silakhor Rural District, Silakhor District, Dorud County, Lorestan Province, Iran. At the 2006 census, its population was 37, in 9 families.
