= Qarah Su Rural District =

Qarah Su Rural District (Persian: دهستان قره سو) may refer to:

- Qarah Su Rural District (Meshgin Shahr County), Ardabil province
- Qarah Su Rural District (Kermanshah County), Kermanshah province
- Qarah Su Rural District (Khoy County), West Azerbaijan province
- Qarah Su Rural District (Maku County), West Azerbaijan province
