= Dowlatabad, Baqerabad =

Village in Qom province, Iran

Dowlatabad Persian: دولت اباد
- Village
- Location within Iran
- Coordinates: 34°42′01″N 50°26′30″E
- Country: Iran
- Province: Qom
- County: Jafarabad
- District: Central
- Rural District: Baqerabad

Population (2016)
  - Total: 308
- Time zone: UTC+3:30 (IRST)

Dowlatabad (Persian: دولت اباد) (Note: Also romanized as Dowlatābād; also known as Daulatābād) is a village in Baqerabad Rural District of the Central District (Note: Formerly Jafarabad District of Qom County) in Jafarabad County, Qom province, Iran.

== Demographics ==
=== Population ===
At the time of the 2006 National Census, the village's population was 305 in 76 households, when it was in Jafarabad Rural District of Jafarabad District (Note: Renamed the Central District of Jafarabad County) in Qom County. The following census in 2011 counted 268 people in 89 households. The 2016 census measured the population of the village as 308 people in 104 households.

In 2021, the district was separated from the county in the establishment of Jafarabad County and renamed the Central District. Dowlatabad was transferred to Baqerabad Rural District created in the same district.
