= Amereh, Qom =

Amoreh آمره
- Village
- Location within Iran
- Coordinates: 34°32′26″N 50°09′39″E
- Country: Iran
- Province: Qom
- County: Qom
- Bakhsh: Khalajestan
- Rural District: Dastjerd

Population (2006)
  - Total: 107
- Time zone: UTC+3:30 (IRST)
  - Summer (DST): UTC+4:30 (IRDT)

Amoreh (Persian: آمره, also Romanized as Āmoreh and Āmoreh) is a village in Dastjerd Rural District, Khalajestan District, Qom County, Qom Province, Iran. At the 2006 census, its population was 107, in 54 families.

The language of Āmoreh is one of endangered Iranian languages. It is located on the border of Central plateau and Northwestern group of Iranian languages.
