= Isaabad, Qom =

Isaabad عيسي اباد
- Village
- Location within Iran
- Coordinates: 34°32′05″N 50°15′59″E
- Country: Iran
- Province: Qom
- County: Qom
- Bakhsh: Khalajestan
- Rural District: Dastjerd

Population (2006)
  - Total: 123
- Time zone: UTC+3:30 (IRST)
  - Summer (DST): UTC+4:30 (IRDT)

Isaabad (Persian: عيسي اباد, also Romanized as ‘Īsáābād; also known as Asáābād and Āsīāābād) is a village in Dastjerd Rural District, Khalajestan District, Qom County, Qom Province, Iran. At the 2006 census, its population was 123, in 47 families.
