= Sar Asiab, Jiroft =

Village in Kerman, Iran

Sar Asiab سراسياب
- Village
- Location within Iran
- Coordinates: 28°40′44″N 57°54′50″E
- Country: Iran
- Province: Kerman
- County: Jiroft
- Bakhsh: Jebalbarez
- Rural District: Rezvan

Population (2006)
  - Total: 95
- Time zone: UTC+3:30 (IRST)
  - Summer (DST): UTC+4:30 (IRDT)

Sar Asiab (Persian: سراسياب, also Romanized as Sar Āsīāb; also known as Āseyāābād, Āsīāābād, and Sar Āsīāb-e Mījān) is a village in Rezvan Rural District, Jebalbarez District, Jiroft County, Kerman Province, Iran. At the 2006 census, its population was 95, in 26 families.
