= Tinuj =

Tinuj طينوج
- Village
- Location within Iran
- Coordinates: 34°32′55″N 50°17′18″E
- Country: Iran
- Province: Markazi
- County: Ashtian
- Rural District: Central

Population (2006)
  - Total: 215
- Time zone: UTC+3:30 (IRST)

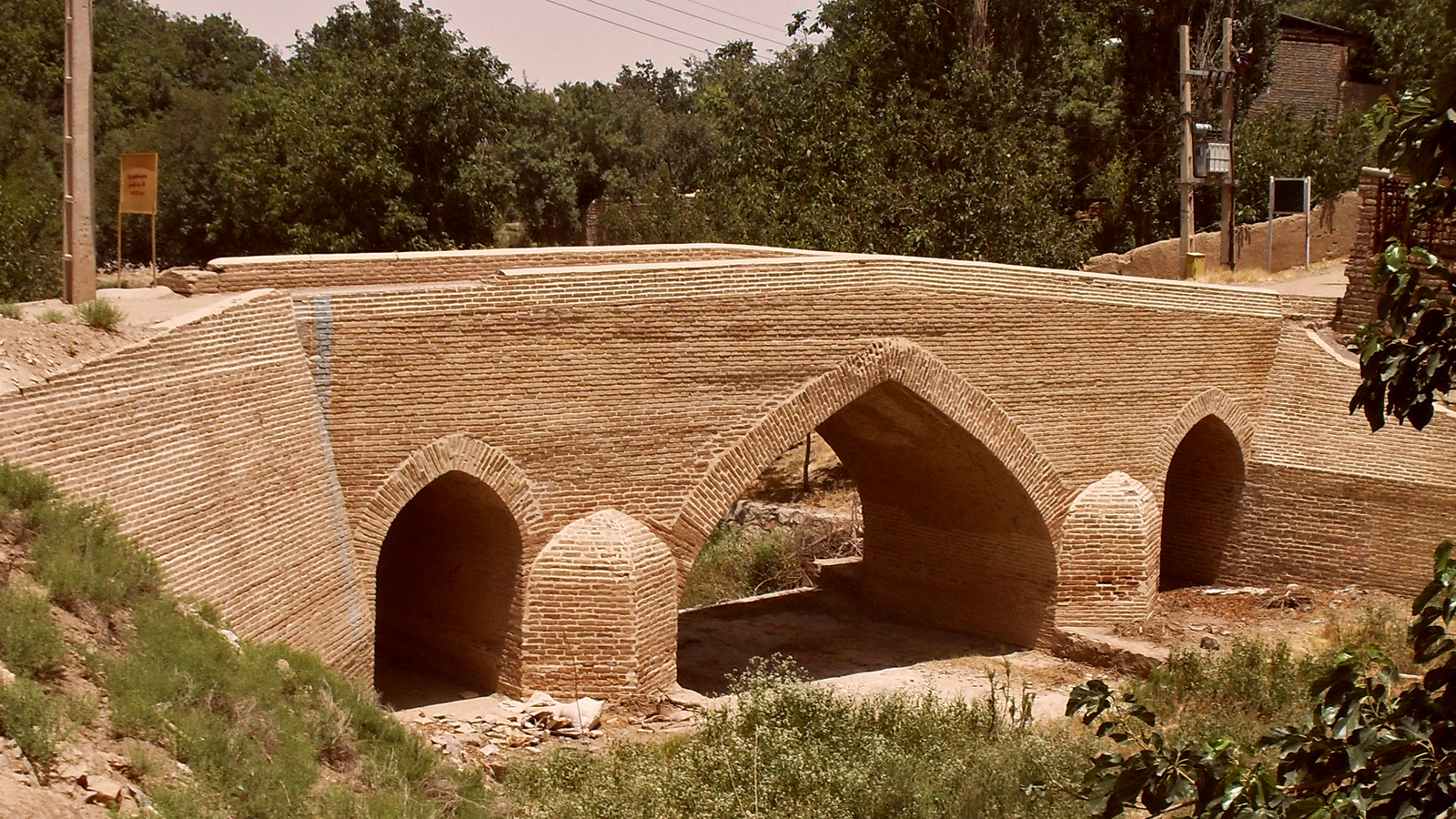
Tinuj Bridge

Tinuj (Persian: طينوج, also Romanized as Ţīnūj) is a village in Ashtian County, Markazi Province, Iran. At the 2006 census, its population was 215, in 92 families.
