= Rahjerd-e Sharqi Rural District =

Rural district in Qom province, Iran

Rahjerd-e Sharqi Rural District Persian: دهستان راهجرد شرقي
- Rural District
- Location within Iran
- Coordinates: 34°29′N 50°32′E
- Country: Iran
- Province: Qom
- County: Qom
- District: Salafchegan
- Established: 1987
- Capital: Salafchegan

Population (2016)
  - Total: 3,928
- Time zone: UTC+3:30 (IRST)

Rahjerd-e Sharqi Rural District (Persian: دهستان راهجرد شرقي) is in Salafchegan District of Qom County, Qom province, Iran. It is administered from the city of Salafchegan.

== Demographics ==
=== Population ===
At the time of the 2006 National Census, the rural district's population was 4,608 in 1,435 households. There were 3,717 inhabitants in 1,235 households at the following census of 2011. The 2016 census measured the population of the rural district as 3,928 in 1,346 households. The most populous of its 58 villages was Jondab, with 1,403 people.

=== Other villages in the rural district ===
- Anayit Beyk
- Eslamabad
- Rahjerd
- Sanjagan
- Taj Khatun
- Yekeh Bagh
- Zavarian
