= Salafchegan District =

District in Qom province, Iran

Salafchegan District Persian: بخش سلفچگان
- District
- Location within Iran
- Coordinates: 34°26′N 50°32′E
- Country: Iran
- Province: Qom
- County: Qom
- Established: 2003
- Capital: Salafchegan

Population (2016)
  - Total: 9,938
- Time zone: UTC+3:30 (IRST)

Salafchegan District (Persian: بخش سلفچگان) is in Qom County, Qom province, Iran. Its capital is the city of Salafchegan.

== History ==
The village of Salafchegan was converted to a city in 2008.

== Demographics ==
=== Population ===
At the time of the 2006 National Census, the district's population was 8,763 in 2,585 households. The following census in 2011 counted 8,515 people in 2,725 households. The 2016 census measured the population of the district as 9,938 inhabitants in 3,272 households.

=== Administrative divisions ===
Salafchegan District Population
Administrative Divisions	2006	2011	2016
Neyzar RD	4,155	4,068	4,620
Rahjerd-e Sharqi RD	4,608	3,717	3,928
Salafchegan (city)		730	1,390
Total	8,763	8,515	9,938
RD = Rural District
