= Qomrud Rural District =

Rural district in Qom province, Iran

Qomrud Rural District Persian: دهستان قمرود
- Rural District
- Location within Iran
- Coordinates: 34°54′N 51°20′E
- Country: Iran
- Province: Qom
- County: Qom
- District: Central
- Established: 1987
- Capital: Qomrud

Population (2016)
  - Total: 7,043
- Time zone: UTC+3:30 (IRST)

Qomrud Rural District (Persian: دهستان قمرود) is in the Central District of Qom County, Qom province, Iran. Its capital is the village of Qomrud.

== Demographics ==
=== Population ===
At the time of the 2006 National Census, the rural district's population was 6,615 in 1,542 households. There were 5,694 inhabitants in 1,463 households at the following census of 2011. The 2016 census measured the population of the rural district as 7,043 in 1,971 households. The most populous of its 119 villages was Qomrud, with 1,703 people.

=== Other villages in the rural district ===
- Damshahr
- Kuh Sefid
- Malekabad
- Mirabad
- Mohammadabad
- Moshkabad
- Qeshlaq-e Malek Qaleh
