= Central District (Qom County) =

District in Qom province, Iran

Central District (Qom County) Persian: بخش مرکزی شهرستان قم
- District
- Location within Iran
- Coordinates: 34°49′N 51°20′E
- Country: Iran
- Province: Qom
- County: Qom
- Capital: Qom

Population (2016)
  - Total: 1,235,485
- Time zone: UTC+3:30 (IRST)

The Central District of Qom County (Persian: بخش مرکزی شهرستان قم) is in Qom province, Iran. Its capital is the city of Qom.

== Demographics ==
=== Population ===
At the time of the 2006 National Census, the district's population was 988,462 in 248,913 households. The following census in 2011 counted 1,102,921 people in 306,395 households. The 2016 census measured the population of the district as 1,235,485 inhabitants in 365,662 households.

=== Administrative divisions ===
Central District (Qom County) Population
Administrative Divisions	2006	2011	2016
Qanavat RD	16,658	13,529	15,617
Qomrud RD	6,615	5,694	7,043
Qanavat (city)	7,693	9,662	11,667
Qom (city)	957,496	1,074,036	1,201,158
Total	988,462	1,102,921	1,235,485
RD = Rural District
