= Qom County =

County in Qom province, Iran

Qom County Persian: شهرستان قم
- County
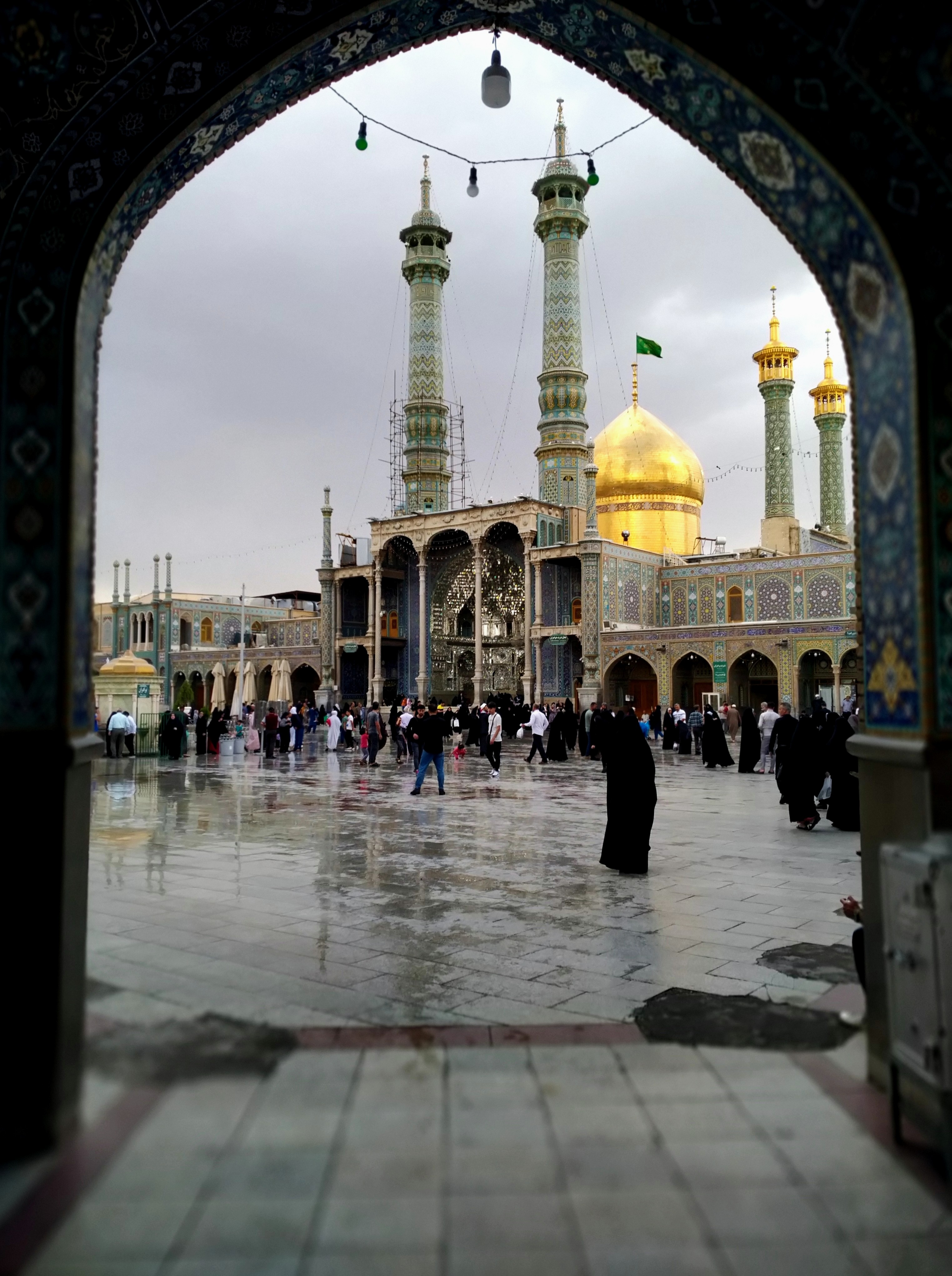
- Fatima Masumeh Shrine in the city of Qom

- Location of Qom County in Qom province (yellow)

- Location of Qom province in Iran
- Coordinates: 34°42′N 51°02′E
- Country: Iran
- Province: Qom
- Capital: Qom
- Districts: Central, Khalajestan, Salafchegan

Population (2016)
  - Total: 1,292,283
- Time zone: UTC+3:30 (IRST)

Qom County (Persian: شهرستان قم) is in Qom province, Iran. Its capital is the city of Qom.

== History ==
The village of Salafchegan was converted to a city in 2008.

In 2021, Jafarabad District (Note: Renamed the Central District of Jafarabad County) and Qahan Rural District were separated from the county in the establishment of Jafarabad County. At the same time, Kahak District (Note: Formerly Nofel Loshato District, renamed the Central District of Kahak County) was separated in establishing Kahak County.

== Demographics ==
=== Population ===
At the time of the 2006 National Census, the county's population was 1,036,714, in 262,313 households. The following census in 2011 counted 1,151,672 people in 320,977 households. The 2016 census measured the population of the county as 1,292,283 in 383,532 households.

=== Administrative divisions ===
Qom County's population history and administrative structure over three consecutive censuses are shown in the following table.

Qom County Population
Administrative Divisions	2006	2011	2016
Central District	988,462	1,102,921	1,235,485
Qanavat RD	16,658	13,529	15,617
Qomrud RD	6,615	5,694	7,043
Qanavat (city)	7,693	9,662	11,667
Qom (city)	957,496	1,074,036	1,201,158
Jafarabad District (Note: Transferred to Jafarabad County after the 2016 census)	15,334	16,919	19,063
Jafarabad RD	8,699	9,716	9,676
Jafariyeh (city)	6,635	7,203	9,387
Kahak District (Note: Formerly Nofel Loshato District; transferred to Kahak County after the 2016 census and renamed the Central District)	14,621	15,235	20,588
Fordo RD	2,265	2,516	3,482
Kahak RD	9,590	9,813	12,269
Kahak (city) (Note: Formerly Nofel Loshato)	2,766	2,906	4,837
Khalajestan District	9,534	8,079	7,207
Dastjerd RD	4,153	3,600	2,782
Qahan RD	4,260	3,145	2,900
Dastjerd (city)	1,121	1,334	1,525
Salafchegan District	8,763	8,515	9,938
Neyzar RD	4,155	4,068	4,620
Rahjerd-e Sharqi RD	4,608	3,717	3,928
Salafchegan (city)		730	1,390
Total	1,036,714	1,151,672	1,292,283
RD = Rural District

== See also ==
Media related to Qom County at Wikimedia Commons
