= Shakheh (disambiguation) =

Shakheh is a village in Ilam Province, Iran.

Shakheh (Persian: شاخه) may also refer to:

- Shakheh, alternate name of Shakh Kupal, Khuzestan Province
- Shakheh-ye Albu Shahbaz, Khuzestan Province
- Shakheh-ye Ghanem, Khuzestan Province
- Shakheh-ye Jadid, Khuzestan Province
- Shakheh-ye Mobaderi, Khuzestan Province
- Shakheh-ye Pain, Andimeshk, Khuzestan Province
- Shakheh-ye Sofla, Khuzestan Province
