= Abu Arabid =

Abu Arabid ابوعرابيد
- Village
- Location within Iran
- Coordinates: 30°46′06″N 48°37′31″E
- Country: Iran
- Province: Khuzestan
- County: Shadegan
- Bakhsh: Central
- Rural District: Jaffal

Population (2006)
  - Total: 648
- Time zone: UTC+3:30 (IRST)
  - Summer (DST): UTC+4:30 (IRDT)

Abu Arabid (Persian: ابوعرابيد, also Romanized as Abū 'Arābīd; also known as Abū 'Arbīdeh) is a village in Jaffal Rural District, in the Central District of Shadegan County, Khuzestan province, Iran. At the 2006 census, its population was 648, in 113 families.

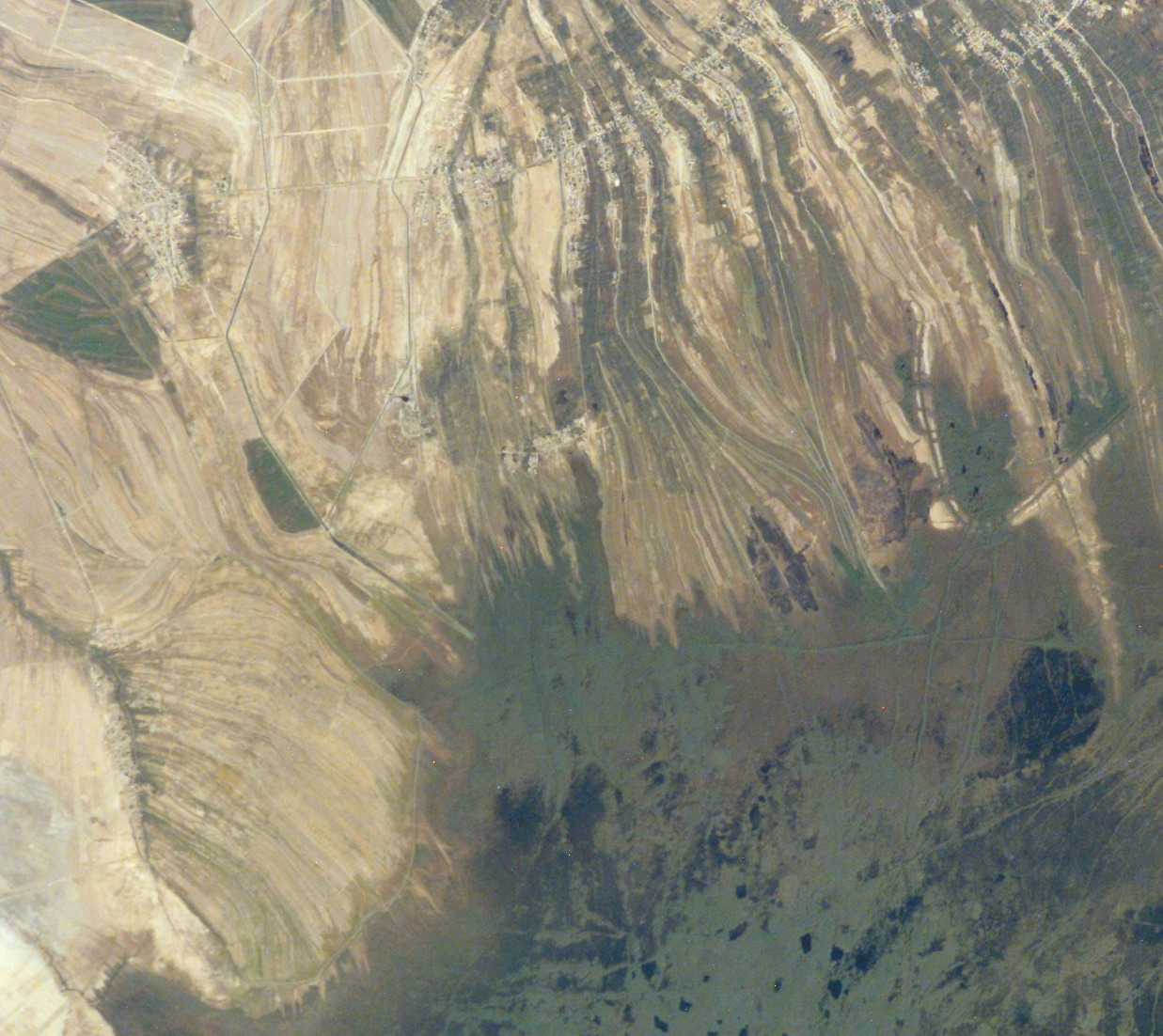
landscape near of Shadegan Ponds, agriculture, nearby villages Albu Shelug, Joghghal-e Aviyeh, ...
