= Jaffal =

Jaffal (Persian: جفال) may refer to:

- Jaffal, Khuzestan
- Jaffal-e Pain, Khuzestan Province
- Jaffal, West Azerbaijan
- Jaffal Rural District, in Khuzestan Province
