= Buzi-ye Seyf =

Village in Khuzestan province, Iran

Buzi-ye Seyf Persian: بوزي سيف
- Village
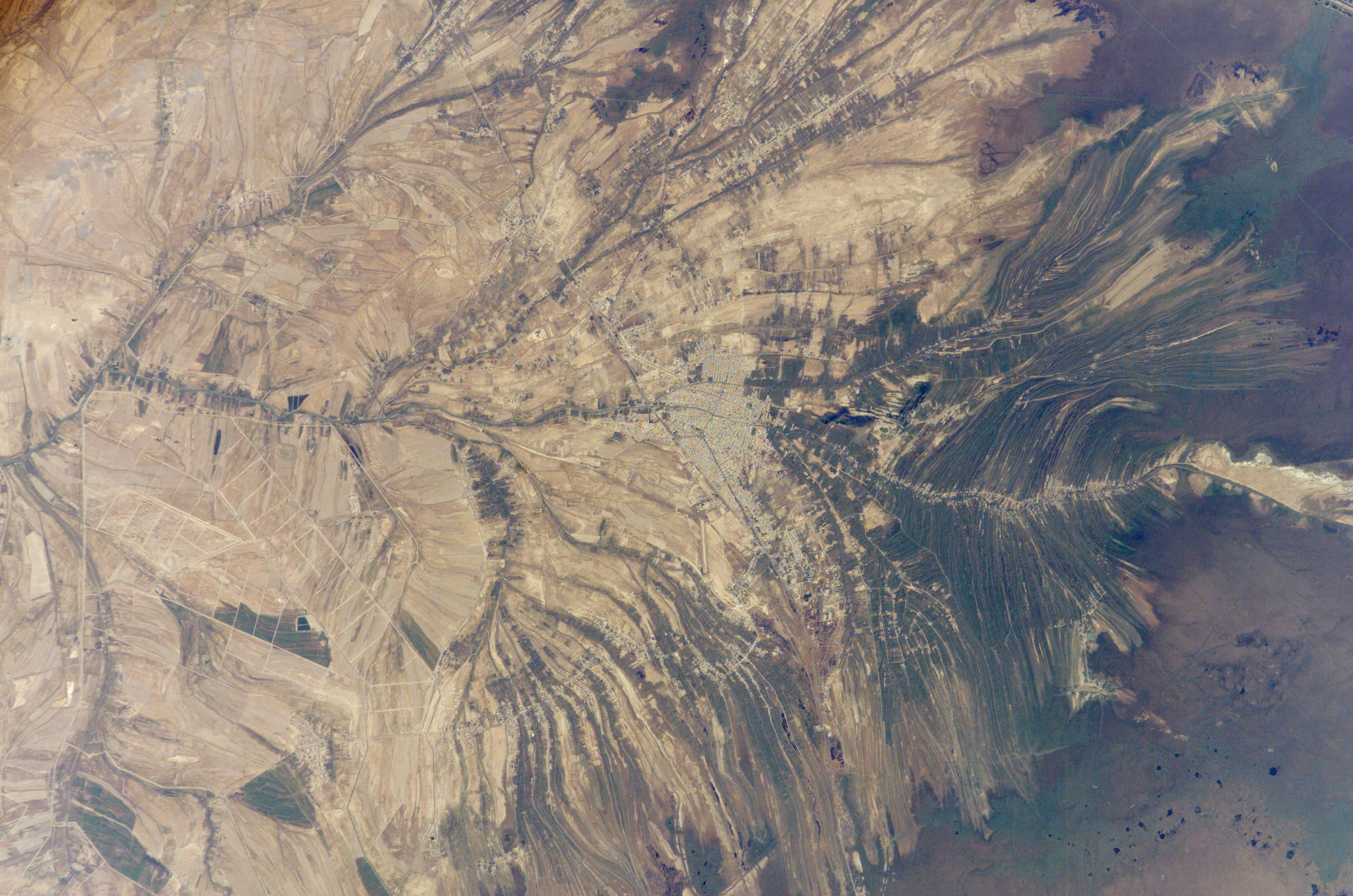
- The village of Buzi-ye Seyf (Buziyeh) and the villages of Aseyfer and Nahr-e Mosallam in the Jarahi River agricultural landscape

- Location within Iran
- Coordinates: 30°39′22″N 48°43′29″E
- Country: Iran
- Province: Khuzestan
- County: Shadegan
- District: Central
- Rural District: Buzi

Population (2016)
  - Total: 2,247
- Time zone: UTC+3:30 (IRST)

Buzi-ye Seyf (Persian: بوزي سيف) (Note: Also romanized as Būzī-ye Seyf; also known as Bozīyeh, Būz, Būzī, and Buzīyeh) is a village in Buzi Rural District of the Central District of Shadegan County, Khuzestan province, Iran.

== Demographics ==
=== Population ===
At the time of the 2006 National Census, the village's population was 2,284 in 394 households. The following census in 2011 counted 2,563 people in 615 households. The 2016 census measured the population of the village as 2,247 people in 582 households. It was the most populous village in its rural district.
