= Chumeh =

Chumeh (Persian: چومه) may refer to:

- Chumeh Karan
- Chumeh Tupchi Masjid
- Chumeh-ye Khazaliyeh
- Chumeh-ye Kuchak
- Chumeh-ye Seyyed Alvan
