= Geydari =

Village in Khuzestan province, Iran

Geydari Persian: گيداري
- Village
- Location within Iran
- Coordinates: 30°38′26″N 48°36′47″E
- Country: Iran
- Province: Khuzestan
- County: Shadegan
- District: Khanafereh
- Rural District: Naseri

Population (2016)
  - Total: 2,229
- Time zone: UTC+3:30 (IRST)

Geydari (Persian: گيداري) (Note: Also romanized as Geydārī) is a village in Naseri Rural District of Khanafereh District, Shadegan County, Khuzestan province, Iran.

== Demographics ==
=== Population ===
At the time of the 2006 National Census, the village's population was 1,954 in 281 households, when it was in Khanafereh Rural District (Note: Renamed Salami Rural District) of the Central District. The following census in 2011 counted 2,422 people in 522 households, by which time the rural district had been separated from the district in the formation of Khanafereh District and renamed Salami Rural District. Geydari was transferred to Naseri Rural District created in the new district. The 2016 census measured the population of the village as 2,229 people in 585 households. It was the most populous village in its rural district.
