= Gahen-e Shavamel =

Gahen-e Shavamel گاهن شوامل
- Village
- Location within Iran
- Coordinates: 30°43′18″N 48°49′34″E
- Country: Iran
- Province: Khuzestan
- County: Shadegan
- Bakhsh: Central
- Rural District: Buzi

Population (2006)
  - Total: 215
- Time zone: UTC+3:30 (IRST)
  - Summer (DST): UTC+4:30 (IRDT)

Gahen-e Shavamel (Persian: گاهن شوامل, also Romanized as Gāhen-e Shavāmel) is a village in Buzi Rural District, in the Central District of Shadegan County, Khuzestan Province, Iran. At the 2006 census, its population was 215, in 40 families.
