= Beyt-e Obeyd =

Beyt-e Obeyd بيت عبيد
- Village
- Location within Iran
- Coordinates: 30°41′00″N 48°38′00″E
- Country: Iran
- Province: Khuzestan
- County: Shadegan
- Bakhsh: Central
- Rural District: Jaffal

Population (2006)
  - Total: 841
- Time zone: UTC+3:30 (IRST)
  - Summer (DST): UTC+4:30 (IRDT)

Beyt-e Obeyd (Persian: بيت عبيد, also Romanized as Beyt-e ‘Obeyd) is a village in Jaffal Rural District, in the Central District of Shadegan County, Khuzestan Province, Iran. At the 2006 census, its population was 841, in 122 families.
