= Jafari-ye Shebeshi =

Jafari-ye Shebeshi جعفري شبيشي
- Village
- Location within Iran
- Coordinates: 30°46′58″N 48°43′27″E
- Country: Iran
- Province: Khuzestan
- County: Shadegan
- Bakhsh: Central
- Rural District: Hoseyni

Population (2006)
  - Total: 276
- Time zone: UTC+3:30 (IRST)
  - Summer (DST): UTC+4:30 (IRDT)

Jafari-ye Shebeshi (Persian: جعفري شبيشي, also Romanized as Jaʿfarī-ye Shebeshī) is a village in Hoseyni Rural District, in the Central District of Shadegan County, Khuzestan Province, Iran. At the 2006 census, its population was 276, in 28 families.
