= Amlahah =

Amlahah املحه
- Village
- Location within Iran
- Coordinates: 30°45′26″N 48°42′40″E
- Country: Iran
- Province: Khuzestan
- County: Shadegan
- Bakhsh: Central
- Rural District: Jaffal

Population (2006)
  - Total: 158
- Time zone: UTC+3:30 (IRST)
  - Summer (DST): UTC+4:30 (IRDT)

Amlahah (Persian: املحه, also Romanized as Amlaḩah; also known as Amlīḩeh and Melḩeh) is a village in Jaffal Rural District, in the Central District of Shadegan County, Khuzestan Province, Iran. At the 2006 census, its population was 158, in 31 families.
