= Savimeh =

Savimeh سويمه
- Village
- Location within Iran
- Coordinates: 30°46′54″N 48°46′30″E
- Country: Iran
- Province: Khuzestan
- County: Shadegan
- Bakhsh: Central
- Rural District: Hoseyni

Population (2006)
  - Total: 139
- Time zone: UTC+3:30 (IRST)
  - Summer (DST): UTC+4:30 (IRDT)

Savimeh (Persian: سويمه, also Romanized as Savīmeh) is a village in Hoseyni Rural District, in the Central District of Shadegan County, Khuzestan Province, Iran. At the 2006 census, its population was 139, in 23 families.
