= Shaverdi =

Shaverdi شاوردي
- Village
- Location within Iran
- Coordinates: 30°36′00″N 48°34′00″E
- Country: Iran
- Province: Khuzestan
- County: Shadegan
- Bakhsh: Khanafereh
- Rural District: Salami

Population (2006)
  - Total: 1,584
- Time zone: UTC+3:30 (IRST)
  - Summer (DST): UTC+4:30 (IRDT)

Shaverdi (Persian: شاوردي, also Romanized as Shāverdī) is a village in Salami Rural District, Khanafereh District, Shadegan County, Khuzestan Province, Iran. At the 2006 census, its population was 1,584, in 285 families.
