= Albu Shelug =

Albu Shelug ابوشلوگ
- Village
- Location within Iran
- Coordinates: 30°43′33″N 48°37′18″E
- Country: Iran
- Province: Khuzestan
- County: Shadegan
- Bakhsh: Central
- Rural District: Jaffal

Population (2006)
  - Total: 308
- Time zone: UTC+3:30 (IRST)
  - Summer (DST): UTC+4:30 (IRDT)

Albu Shelug (Persian: ابوشلوگ, also Romanized as Ālbū Shelūg; also known as Abū Chalāk, Abū Shalūk, and Abū Sholūg) is a village in Jaffal Rural District, in the Central District of Shadegan County, Khuzestan Province, Iran. At the 2006 census, its population was 308, in 40 families.

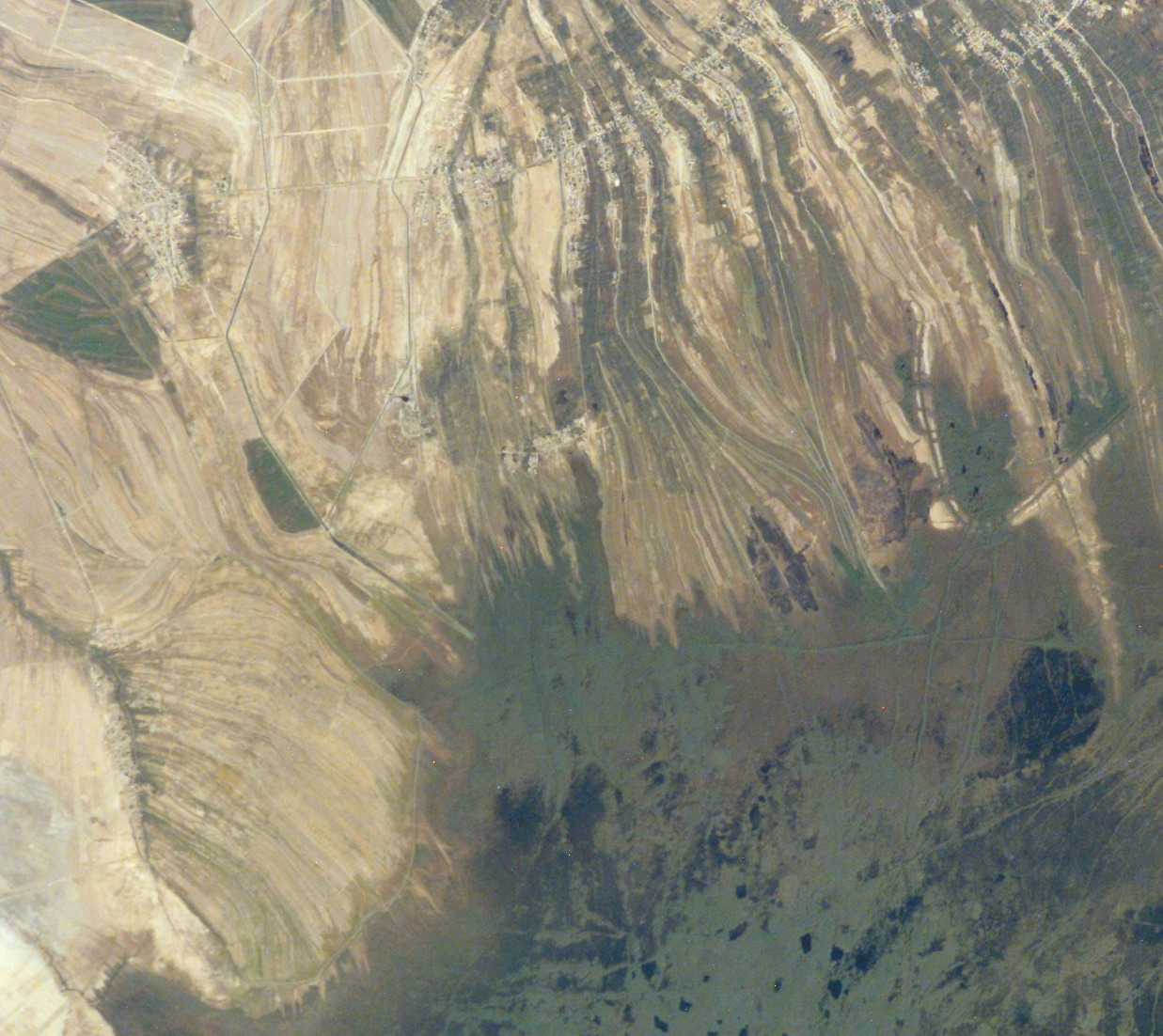
landscape of village Albu Shelug, agriculture, Shadegan Ponds
