= Ghorabi =

Ghorabi غرابي
- Village
- Location within Iran
- Coordinates: 30°46′53″N 48°43′13″E
- Country: Iran
- Province: Khuzestan
- County: Shadegan
- Bakhsh: Central
- Rural District: Hoseyni

Population (2006)
  - Total: 102
- Time zone: UTC+3:30 (IRST)
  - Summer (DST): UTC+4:30 (IRDT)

Ghorabi (Persian: غرابي, also Romanized as Ghorābī) is a village in Hoseyni Rural District, Central District of Shadegan County, Khuzestan Province, Iran. At the 2006 census, its population was 102, in 12 families.
