= Garmeh-ye Khorusi =

Garmeh-ye Khorusi گرمه خروسي
- Village
- Location within Iran
- Coordinates: 30°37′14″N 48°34′57″E
- Country: Iran
- Province: Khuzestan
- County: Shadegan
- Bakhsh: Khanafereh
- Rural District: Naseri

Population (2006)
  - Total: 334
- Time zone: UTC+3:30 (IRST)
  - Summer (DST): UTC+4:30 (IRDT)

Garmeh-ye Khorusi (Persian: گرمه خروسي, also Romanized as Garmeh-ye Khorūsī) is a village in Naseri Rural District, Khanafereh District, Shadegan County, Khuzestan Province, Iran. At the 2006 census, its population was 334, in 50 families.
