= Khoveynes =

Khoveynes خوينس
- Village
- Location within Iran
- Coordinates: 30°45′30″N 48°51′48″E
- Country: Iran
- Province: Khuzestan
- County: Shadegan
- Bakhsh: Central
- Rural District: Buzi

Population (2006)
  - Total: 186
- Time zone: UTC+3:30 (IRST)
  - Summer (DST): UTC+4:30 (IRDT)

Khoveynes (Persian: خوينس; also known as Khovnes and Khūnes) is a village in Buzi Rural District, in the Central District of Shadegan County, Khuzestan Province, Iran. At the 2006 census, its population was 186, in 35 families.
