= Nahr-e Khaf =

Nahr-e Khvaf نهرخواف
- Village
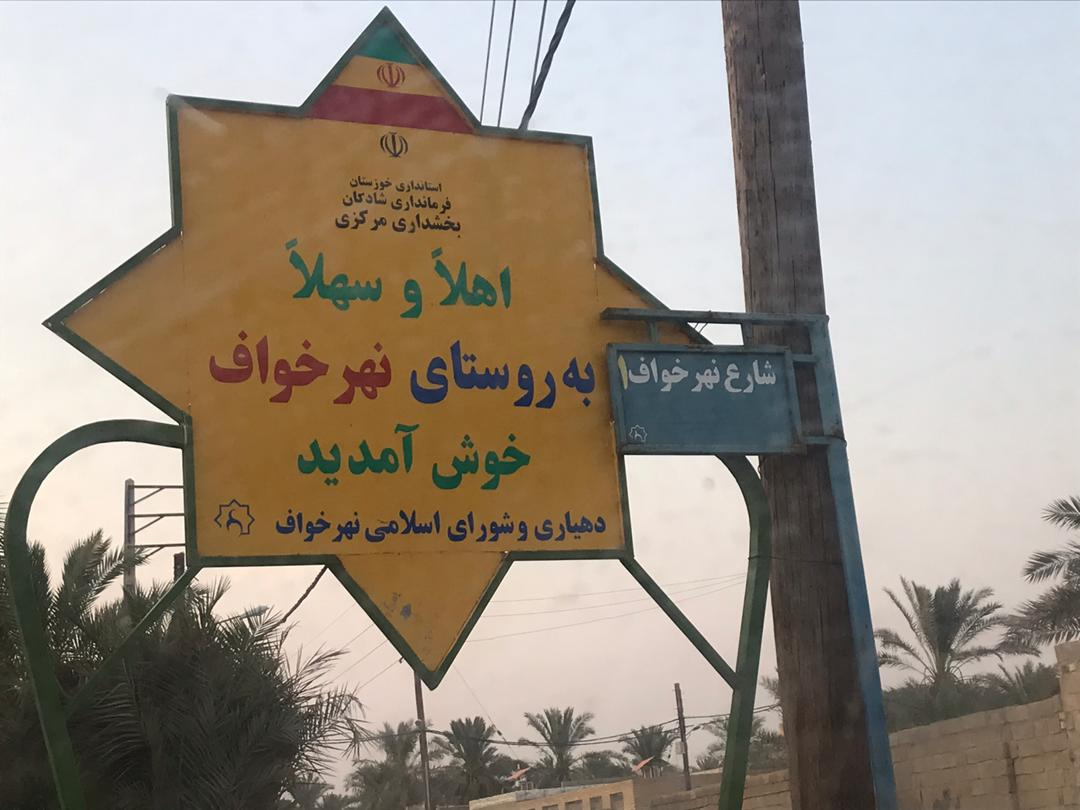
- Nahar Khawaf Village.jpg
- Country: Iran
- Province: Khuzestan
- County: Shadegan
- Bakhsh: Central
- Rural District: Jaffal

Population (2006)
  - Total: 254
- Time zone: UTC+3:30 (IRST)
  - Summer (DST): UTC+4:30 (IRDT)

Nahr-e Khvaf (Persian: نهرخواف, also Romanized as Nahr-e Khvāf) is a village in Jaffal Rural District, in the Central District of Shadegan County, Khuzestan Province, Iran. At the 2006 census, its population was 254, in 40 families.
