= Albusavadi =

Albusavadi البوسوادي
- Village
- Location within Iran
- Coordinates: 30°39′56″N 48°37′37″E
- Country: Iran
- Province: Khuzestan
- County: Shadegan
- Bakhsh: Central
- Rural District: Jaffal

Population (2006)
  - Total: 597
- Time zone: UTC+3:30 (IRST)
  - Summer (DST): UTC+4:30 (IRDT)

Albusavadi (Persian: البوسوادي, also Romanized as Ālbūsavādī) is a village in Jaffal Rural District, in the Central District of Shadegan County, Khuzestan Province, Iran. At the 2006 census, the population totaled 597 people across 108 families.
