= Arbihat =

Arbihat اربيحات
- Village
- Location within Iran
- Coordinates: 30°40′31″N 48°39′54″E
- Country: Iran
- Province: Khuzestan
- County: Shadegan
- Bakhsh: Central
- Rural District: Hoseyni

Population (2006)
  - Total: 57
- Time zone: UTC+3:30 (IRST)
  - Summer (DST): UTC+4:30 (IRDT)

Arbihat (Persian: اربيحات, also Romanized as Arbīḩāt) is a village in Hoseyni Rural District, in the Central District of Shadegan County, Khuzestan Province, Iran. As of the 2006 census, its population was 57, in 13 families.
