= Sobakhiyeh =

Sobakhiyeh صبخيه
- Village
- Location within Iran
- Coordinates: 30°44′27″N 48°42′16″E
- Country: Iran
- Province: Khuzestan
- County: Shadegan
- Bakhsh: Central
- Rural District: Jaffal

Population (2006)
  - Total: 29
- Time zone: UTC+3:30 (IRST)
  - Summer (DST): UTC+4:30 (IRDT)

Sobakhiyeh (Persian: صبخيه, also Romanized as Şobākhīyeh; also known as Şabbāḩīyeh) is a village in Jaffal Rural District, in the Central District of Shadegan County, Khuzestan Province, Iran. At the 2006 census, its population was 29, in 5 families.
