= Albu Naim =

Albu Naim البونعيم
- Village
- Location within Iran
- Coordinates: 30°43′29″N 48°44′43″E
- Country: Iran
- Province: Khuzestan
- County: Shadegan
- Bakhsh: Central
- Rural District: Hoseyni

Population (2006)
  - Total: 259
- Time zone: UTC+3:30 (IRST)
  - Summer (DST): UTC+4:30 (IRDT)

Albu Naim (Persian: البونعيم, also Romanized as Ālbū Na‘īm, Al Bowna‘īm, Ālbū Na‘ayyem, Al Būna‘īm, and Āl-e Bū Na‘īm) is a village in Hoseyni Rural District, in the Central District of Shadegan County, Khuzestan Province, Iran. At the 2006 census, its population was 259, in 44 families.
