= Salami, Shadegan =

Village in Khuzestan province, Iran

Salami Persian: سالمي
- Village
- Location within Iran
- Coordinates: 30°37′04″N 48°38′02″E
- Country: Iran
- Province: Khuzestan
- County: Shadegan
- District: Khanafereh
- Rural District: Salami

Population (2016)
  - Total: 3,019
- Time zone: UTC+3:30 (IRST)

Salami (Persian: سالمي) (Note: Also romanized as Sālamī and Sālemī; also known as Sālemī-ye Yek) is a village in Salami Rural District (Note: Formerly Khanafereh Rural District) of Khanafereh District, Shadegan County, Khuzestan province, Iran.

== Demographics ==
=== Population ===
At the time of the 2006 National Census, the village's population was 2,173 in 375 households, when it was in Khanafereh Rural District (Note: Renamed Salami Rural District) of the Central District. The following census in 2011 counted 2,859 people in 666 households, by which time the rural district had been separated from the district in the formation of Khanafereh District and renamed Salami Rural District. The 2016 census measured the population of the village as 3,019 people in 763 households. It was the most populous village in its rural district.
