= Albu Obeyd =

Albu Obeyd البوعبيد
- Village
- Location within Iran
- Coordinates: 30°41′01″N 48°41′10″E
- Country: Iran
- Province: Khuzestan
- County: Shadegan
- Bakhsh: Central
- Rural District: Hoseyni

Population (2006)
  - Total: 714
- Time zone: UTC+3:30 (IRST)
  - Summer (DST): UTC+4:30 (IRDT)

Albu Obeyd (Persian: البوعبيد, also Romanized as Ālbū ‘Obeyd and Albū ‘Obeyd) is a village in Hoseyni Rural District, in the Central District of Shadegan County, Khuzestan Province, Iran. At the 2006 census, its population was 714, in 103 families.
