= Nahr-e Ebn Naser-e Sofla =

Nahr-e Ebn Naser-e Sofla نهرابن ناصرسفلي
- Village
- Location within Iran
- Coordinates: 30°47′25″N 48°46′50″E
- Country: Iran
- Province: Khuzestan
- County: Shadegan
- Bakhsh: Central
- Rural District: Hoseyni

Population (2006)
  - Total: 110
- Time zone: UTC+3:30 (IRST)
  - Summer (DST): UTC+4:30 (IRDT)

Nahr-e Ebn Naser-e Sofla (Persian: نهرابن ناصرسفلي, also Romanized as Nahr-e Ebn Nāṣer-e Soflá; also known as Nahr-e Bennāṣer-e Soflá) is a village in Hoseyni Rural District, in the Central District of Shadegan County, Khuzestan Province, Iran. At the 2006 census, its population was 110, in 16 families.
