= Sufiyah =

Sufiyah صوفيه
- Village
- Location within Iran
- Coordinates: 30°45′17″N 48°45′19″E
- Country: Iran
- Province: Khuzestan
- County: Shadegan
- Bakhsh: Central
- Rural District: Hoseyni

Population (2006)
  - Total: 147
- Time zone: UTC+3:30 (IRST)
  - Summer (DST): UTC+4:30 (IRDT)

Sufiyah (Persian: صوفيه, also Romanized as Şūfīyah; also known as Al Başūf and Boşūf) is a village in Hoseyni Rural District, in the Central District of Shadegan County, Khuzestan Province, Iran. At the 2006 census, its population was 147, in 23 families.
