= Albujenam =

Albujenam البوجنام
- Village
- Location within Iran
- Coordinates: 30°37′20″N 48°37′05″E
- Country: Iran
- Province: Khuzestan
- County: Shadegan
- Bakhsh: Khanafereh
- Rural District: Salami

Population (2006)
  - Total: 869
- Time zone: UTC+3:30 (IRST)
  - Summer (DST): UTC+4:30 (IRDT)

Albujenam (Persian: البوجنام, also Romanized as Ālbūjenām) is a village in Salami Rural District, Khanafereh District, Shadegan County, Khuzestan Province, Iran. At the 2006 census, its population was 869, in 131 families.
