= Mosaffa =

Mosaffa مصفا
- Village
- Location within Iran
- Coordinates: 30°41′35″N 48°38′28″E
- Country: Iran
- Province: Khuzestan
- County: Shadegan
- Bakhsh: Central
- Rural District: Jaffal

Population (2006)
  - Total: 441
- Time zone: UTC+3:30 (IRST)
  - Summer (DST): UTC+4:30 (IRDT)

Mosaffa (Persian: مصفا, also Romanized as Moṣaffā; also known as Moṣaffā-e Do) is a village in Jaffal Rural District, in the Central District of Shadegan County, Khuzestan Province, Iran. At the 2006 census, its population was 441, in 79 families.
