= Nahr-e Saleh =

Village in Khuzestan, Iran

Nahr-e Saleh نهرصالح
- Village
- Location within Iran
- Coordinates: 30°42′00″N 48°39′00″E
- Country: Iran
- Province: Khuzestan
- County: Shadegan
- Bakhsh: Central
- Rural District: Jaffal

Population (2006)
  - Total: 295
- Time zone: UTC+3:30 (IRST)
  - Summer (DST): UTC+4:30 (IRDT)

Nahr-e Saleh (Persian: نهرصالح, also Romanized as Nahr-e Şāleḩ) is a village in Jaffal Rural District, in the Central District of Shadegan County, Khuzestan Province, Iran. At the 2006 census, its population was 295, in 53 families.
