= Nahr-e Ebn Arbeyd =

Nahr-e Ebn Arbeyd نهرابن عربيد
- Village
- Location within Iran
- Coordinates: 30°47′14″N 48°46′35″E
- Country: Iran
- Province: Khuzestan
- County: Shadegan
- Bakhsh: Central
- Rural District: Hoseyni

Population (2006)
  - Total: 71
- Time zone: UTC+3:30 (IRST)
  - Summer (DST): UTC+4:30 (IRDT)

Nahr-e Ebn Arbeyd (Persian: نهرابن عربيد, also Romanized as Nahr-e Ebn ‘Arbeyd; also known as Nahr-e Ben ‘Arbeyd) is a village in Hoseyni Rural District, in the Central District of Shadegan County, Khuzestan Province, Iran. At the 2006 census, its population was 71, in 9 families.
