= Ghiazi =

Ghiazi غياضي
- Village
- Location within Iran
- Coordinates: 30°39′00″N 48°37′00″E
- Country: Iran
- Province: Khuzestan
- County: Shadegan
- Bakhsh: Khanafereh
- Rural District: Naseri

Population (2006)
  - Total: 425
- Time zone: UTC+3:30 (IRST)
  - Summer (DST): UTC+4:30 (IRDT)

Ghiazi (Persian: غياضي, also Romanized as Ghīāẕī and Gheyāẕī) is a village in Naseri Rural District, Khanafereh District, Shadegan County, Khuzestan Province, Iran. At the 2006 census, its population was 425, in 68 families.
