= Qariyeh-ye Shavardi =

Qariyeh-ye Shavardi قريه شاوردي
- Village
- Country: Iran
- Province: Khuzestan
- County: Shadegan
- Bakhsh: Khanafereh
- Rural District: Naseri

Population (2006)
  - Total: 266
- Time zone: UTC+3:30 (IRST)
  - Summer (DST): UTC+4:30 (IRDT)

Qariyeh-ye Shavardi (Persian: قريه شاوردي, also Romanized as Qarīyeh-ye Shāverdī) is a village in Naseri Rural District, Khanafereh District, Shadegan County, Khuzestan Province, Iran. At the 2006 census, its population was 266, in 36 families.
