= Egleh =

Egleh عگله
- Village
- Location within Iran
- Coordinates: 30°49′08″N 48°45′36″E
- Country: Iran
- Province: Khuzestan
- County: Shadegan
- Bakhsh: Central
- Rural District: Hoseyni

Population (2006)
  - Total: 197
- Time zone: UTC+3:30 (IRST)
  - Summer (DST): UTC+4:30 (IRDT)

Egleh (Persian: عگله, also Romanized as ʿEgleh) is a village in Hoseyni Rural District, in the Central District of Shadegan County, Khuzestan Province, Iran. At the 2006 census, its population was 197, in 34 families.
