= Mangushi =

Mangushi منگوشي
- Village
- Location within Iran
- Coordinates: 30°40′15″N 48°45′40″E
- Country: Iran
- Province: Khuzestan
- County: Shadegan
- Bakhsh: Central
- Rural District: Buzi

Population (2006)
  - Total: 90
- Time zone: UTC+3:30 (IRST)
  - Summer (DST): UTC+4:30 (IRDT)

Mangushi (Persian: منگوشي, also Romanized as Mangūshī) is a village in Buzi Rural District, in the Central District of Shadegan County, Khuzestan Province, Iran. At the 2006 census, its population was 90, in 17 families.
