= Naseri, Khuzestan =

Village in Khuzestan province, Iran

Naseri Persian: ناصری
- Village
- Location within Iran
- Coordinates: 30°39′00″N 48°37′15″E
- Country: Iran
- Province: Khuzestan
- County: Shadegan
- District: Khanafereh
- Rural District: Naseri

Population (2016)
  - Total: 1,606
- Time zone: UTC+3:30 (IRST)

Naseri (Persian: ناصری) (Note: Also romanized as Nāserī) is a village in, and the capital of, Naseri Rural District of Khanafereh District, Shadegan County, Khuzestan province, Iran.

== Demographics ==
=== Population ===
At the time of the 2006 National Census, the village's population was 1,426 in 226 households, when it was in Khanafereh Rural District (Note: Renamed Salami Rural District) of the Central District. The following census in 2011 counted 1,843 people in 415 households, by which time the rural district had been separated from the district in the formation of Khanafereh District and renamed Salami Rural District. Naseri was transferred to Naseri Rural District created in the new district. The 2016 census measured the population of the village as 1,606 people in 417 households.
