= Shahrak-e Montazeri =

Shahrak-e Montazeri شهرك منتظري
- Village
- Location within Iran
- Coordinates: 30°39′07″N 48°37′59″E
- Country: Iran
- Province: Khuzestan
- County: Shadegan
- Bakhsh: Khanafereh
- Rural District: Naseri

Population (2006)
  - Total: 2,133
- Time zone: UTC+3:30 (IRST)
  - Summer (DST): UTC+4:30 (IRDT)

Shahrak-e Montazeri (Persian: شهرك منتظري, also Romanized as Shahrak-e Montaz̧erī) is a village in Naseri Rural District, Khanafereh District, Shadegan County, Khuzestan Province, Iran. At the 2006 census, its population was 2,133, in 375 families.
