= Feyyeh-ye Shavardi =

Feyyeh-ye Shavardi فيه شاوردي
- Village
- Location within Iran
- Coordinates: 30°37′00″N 48°36′35″E
- Country: Iran
- Province: Khuzestan
- County: Shadegan
- Bakhsh: Khanafereh
- Rural District: Salami

Population (2006)
  - Total: 2,430
- Time zone: UTC+3:30 (IRST)
  - Summer (DST): UTC+4:30 (IRDT)

Feyyeh-ye Shavardi (Persian: فيه شاوردي, also Romanized as Feyyeh-ye Shāvardī) is a village in Salami Rural District, Khanafereh District, Shadegan County, Khuzestan Province, Iran. At the 2006 census, its population was 2,430, in 466 families.
