= Albu Bandar =

Albu Bandar البوبندر
- Village
- Location within Iran
- Coordinates: 30°42′49″N 48°44′17″E
- Country: Iran
- Province: Khuzestan
- County: Shadegan
- Bakhsh: Central
- Rural District: Buzi

Population (2006)
  - Total: 394
- Time zone: UTC+3:30 (IRST)
  - Summer (DST): UTC+4:30 (IRDT)

Albu Bandar (Persian: البوبندر, also Romanized as Albū Bandar) is a village in Buzi Rural District, in the Central District of Shadegan County, Khuzestan Province, Iran. At the 2006 census, its population was 394, in 79 families.
