= Sarakhiyeh =

Sarakhiyeh (Sarāxiye)
- Village
- Location within Iran
- Coordinates: 30°40′52″N 48°32′18″E
- Country: Iran
- Province: Khuzestan
- County: Shadegan
- Bakhsh: Khanafereh
- Rural District: Salami

Population (2006)
  - Total: 515
- Time zone: UTC+3:30 (IRST)
  - Summer (DST): UTC+4:30 (IRDT)

Sarakhiyeh (Persian: Sarāxiye, also Romanized as Sarākhīyeh) is a village in Salami Rural District, Khanafereh District, Shadegan County, Khuzestan Province, Iran. At the 2006 census, its population was 515, in 74 families.
