= Bahhas =

Bahhas بحاث
- Village
- Location within Iran
- Coordinates: 30°48′05″N 48°43′13″E
- Country: Iran
- Province: Khuzestan
- County: Shadegan
- Bakhsh: Central
- Rural District: Hoseyni

Population (2006)
  - Total: 225
- Time zone: UTC+3:30 (IRST)
  - Summer (DST): UTC+4:30 (IRDT)

Bahhas (Persian: بحاث, also Romanized as Bahhās̄, Baḩās̄, and Baḩḩās̄) is a village in Hoseyni Rural District, in the Central District of Shadegan County, Khuzestan Province, Iran. At the 2006 census, its population was 225, in 31 families.
