= Naseri =

Naseri (Persian: ناصري) may refer to:

- Naceri, surname in Persian and Arabic languages
- Nâseri, name given to the old town of Ahwaz
- Naseri, Bushehr, a village in Bushehr Province, Iran
- Naseri, Kerman, a village in Kerman Province, Iran
- Naseri, Khuzestan, a village in Khuzestan Province, Iran
- Naseri, Kohgiluyeh and Boyer-Ahmad, a village in Kohgiluyeh and Boyer-Ahmad Province, Iran
- Naseri, Qazvin, a village in Qazvin Province, Iran
- Naseri Rural District, in Khuzestan Province, Iran
