= Sharukhiyeh =

Sharukhiyeh شاروخيه
- Village
- Location within Iran
- Coordinates: 30°46′36″N 48°46′57″E
- Country: Iran
- Province: Khuzestan
- County: Shadegan
- Bakhsh: Central
- Rural District: Buzi

Population (2006)
  - Total: 68
- Time zone: UTC+3:30 (IRST)
  - Summer (DST): UTC+4:30 (IRDT)

Sharukhiyeh (Persian: شاروخيه, also Romanized as Shārūkhīyeh; also known as Shāhrokhīyeh) is a village in Buzi Rural District, in the Central District of Shadegan County, Khuzestan Province, Iran. At the 2006 census, its population was 68, in 13 families.
