= Shakheh-ye Pain =

Shakheh-ye Pain (Persian: شاخه پايين) may refer to:

- Shakheh-ye Pain, Andimeshk
- Shakheh-ye Pain, alternate name of Shakheh-ye Albu Shahbaz, Shadegan County
- Shakheh-ye Pain, alternate name of Shakheh-ye Sofla, Shadegan County
