= Nahr-e Seyyed =

Nahr-e Seyyed نهرسيد
- Village
- Location within Iran
- Coordinates: 30°46′27″N 48°50′00″E
- Country: Iran
- Province: Khuzestan
- County: Shadegan
- Bakhsh: Central
- Rural District: Hoseyni

Population (2006)
  - Total: 37
- Time zone: UTC+3:30 (IRST)
  - Summer (DST): UTC+4:30 (IRDT)

Nahr-e Seyyed (Persian: نهرسيد) is a village in Hoseyni Rural District, in the Central District of Shadegan County, Khuzestan Province, Iran. At the 2006 census, its population was 37, in 6 families.
