= Sakran, Iran =

Sakran سكران
- Village
- Location within Iran
- Coordinates: 30°41′00″N 48°52′00″E
- Country: Iran
- Province: Khuzestan
- County: Shadegan
- Bakhsh: Central
- Rural District: Buzi

Population (2006)
  - Total: 29
- Time zone: UTC+3:30 (IRST)
  - Summer (DST): UTC+4:30 (IRDT)

Sakran (Persian: سكران, also Romanized as Sakrān) is a village in Buzi Rural District, in the Central District of Shadegan County, Khuzestan Province, Iran. At the 2006 census, its population was 29, in 4 families.
