= Fargh Zayer =

Fargh Zayer فرغ زاير
- Village
- Location within Iran
- Coordinates: 30°40′09″N 48°37′58″E
- Country: Iran
- Province: Khuzestan
- County: Shadegan
- Bakhsh: Central
- Rural District: Jaffal

Population (2006)
  - Total: 641
- Time zone: UTC+3:30 (IRST)
  - Summer (DST): UTC+4:30 (IRDT)

Fargh Zayer (Persian: فرغ زاير, also Romanized as Fargh Zāyer) is a village in Jaffal Rural District, in the Central District of Shadegan County, Khuzestan Province, Iran. At the 2006 census, its population was 641, in 110 families.
