= Nahr-e Sheykh =

Nahr-e Sheykh نهرشيخ
- Village
- Location within Iran
- Coordinates: 30°45′30″N 48°52′03″E
- Country: Iran
- Province: Khuzestan
- County: Shadegan
- Bakhsh: Central
- Rural District: Buzi

Population (2006)
  - Total: 133
- Time zone: UTC+3:30 (IRST)
  - Summer (DST): UTC+4:30 (IRDT)

Nahr-e Sheykh (Persian: نهرشيخ) is a village in Buzi Rural District, in the Central District of Shadegan County, Khuzestan Province, Iran. At the 2006 census, its population was 133, in 29 families.
