= Ragbeh =

Ragbeh رگبه
- Village
- Location within Iran
- Coordinates: 30°40′51″N 48°33′51″E
- Country: Iran
- Province: Khuzestan
- County: Shadegan
- Bakhsh: Khanafereh
- Rural District: Naseri

Population (2006)
  - Total: 1,131
- Time zone: UTC+3:30 (IRST)
  - Summer (DST): UTC+4:30 (IRDT)

Ragbeh (Persian: رگبه; also known as Jeysh and Rogbā) is a village in Naseri Rural District, Khanafereh District, Shadegan County, Khuzestan Province, Iran. At the 2006 census, its population was 1,131, in 161 families.
