= Badrani =

Badrani بدراني
- Village
- Location within Iran
- Coordinates: 30°41′04″N 48°38′17″E
- Country: Iran
- Province: Khuzestan
- County: Shadegan
- Bakhsh: Central
- Rural District: Jaffal

Population (2006)
  - Total: 829
- Time zone: UTC+3:30 (IRST)
  - Summer (DST): UTC+4:30 (IRDT)

Badrani (Persian: بدراني, also Romanized as Badrānī and Bedrānī) is a village in Jaffal Rural District, in the Central District of Shadegan County, Khuzestan Province, Iran. At the 2006 census, its population was 829, in 154 families.
