= Joghghal-e Khvayeh =

Joghghal-e Khvayeh جغال خوايه
- Village
- Location within Iran
- Coordinates: 30°44′52″N 48°39′04″E
- Country: Iran
- Province: Khuzestan
- County: Shadegan
- Bakhsh: Central
- Rural District: Jaffal

Population (2006)
  - Total: 1,260
- Time zone: UTC+3:30 (IRST)
  - Summer (DST): UTC+4:30 (IRDT)

Joghghal-e Khvayeh (Persian: جغال خوايه, also Romanized as Joghghāl-e Khvāyeh; also known as Joghghāl-e Bālā) is a village in Jaffal Rural District, in the Central District of Shadegan County, Khuzestan Province, Iran. At the 2006 census, its population was 1,260, in 202 families.
