= Aseyfer =

Aseyfer اصيفر
- Village
- Location within Iran
- Coordinates: 30°38′57″N 48°44′29″E
- Country: Iran
- Province: Khuzestan
- County: Shadegan
- Bakhsh: Central
- Rural District: Buzi

Population (2006)
  - Total: 495
- Time zone: UTC+3:30 (IRST)
  - Summer (DST): UTC+4:30 (IRDT)

Aseyfer (Persian: اصيفر, also Romanized as Āṣeyfer) is a village in Buzi Rural District, in the Central District of Shadegan County, Khuzestan Province, Iran. At the 2006 census, its population was 495, in 76 families.
