= Chumeh-ye Khazaliyeh =

Chumeh-ye Khazaliyeh چومه خزعليه
- Village
- Location within Iran
- Coordinates: 30°48′53″N 48°42′57″E
- Country: Iran
- Province: Khuzestan
- County: Shadegan
- Bakhsh: Central
- Rural District: Hoseyni

Population (2006)
  - Total: 57
- Time zone: UTC+3:30 (IRST)
  - Summer (DST): UTC+4:30 (IRDT)

Chumeh-ye Khazaliyeh (Persian: چومه خزعليه, also Romanized as Chūmeh-ye Khazʿalīyeh) is a village in Hoseyni Rural District, in the Central District of Shadegan County, Khuzestan Province, Iran. At the 2006 census, its population was 57, in 7 families.
