= Joghghal =

Joghghal (Persian: جغال) may refer to:

- Joghghal-e Aviyeh
- Joghghal-e Khvayeh
