= Nasseri =

Nasseri (Persian: ناصری) is a surname, commonly found in the Persian and Arabic language. Notable people with the surname include:

- Jesus of Nazareth (c. 4 BC), central figure of Christianity, known in Arabic as "Yesu' Al-Nasseri" (Arabic: يسوع الناصري)
- Abdollah Nasseri (1992), Iranian football defender
- Abdulla Sultan Al Nasseri (1986), Emirati footballer
- Alireza Ghaleh Nasseri, Iranian Paralympic athlete
- Feizollah Nasseri (1955), retired Iranian weightlifter
- Majid Nasseri (1968), Iranian former cyclist
- Mehran Karimi Nasseri (1946–2022), Iranian refugee
- Mohammad Nasseri (1993), Iranian Football goalkeeper
- Navid Nasseri (1996), Iranian-English footballer
- Reza Nasseri (1975), Iranian retired futsal player and current coach
- Soheil Nasseri (1979), American pianist
- Yahia Nasseri, Iraqi politician

== See also ==
- Naceri, another transcription of the surname
- Naseri (disambiguation), another transcription of the same Iranian surname
