= Sowdeh-ye Sofla =

Sowdeh-ye Sofla سوده سفلي
- Village
- Location within Iran
- Coordinates: 30°38′17″N 48°47′53″E
- Country: Iran
- Province: Khuzestan
- County: Shadegan
- Bakhsh: Central
- Rural District: Buzi

Population (2006)
  - Total: 46
- Time zone: UTC+3:30 (IRST)
  - Summer (DST): UTC+4:30 (IRDT)

Sowdeh-ye Sofla (Persian: سوده سفلي, also Romanized as Sowdeh-ye Soflá; also known as Sowdā-ye Pā’īn, Sowdā-ye Soflá, and Sowdeh-ye Pā’īn) is a village in Buzi Rural District, in the Central District of Shadegan County, Khuzestan Province, Iran. At the 2006 census, its population was 46, in 11 families.
