= Chumeh Tupchi Masjid =

Chumeh Tupchi Masjid چومه توپچي مسجد
- Village
- Location within Iran
- Coordinates: 30°41′34″N 48°38′01″E
- Country: Iran
- Province: Khuzestan
- County: Shadegan
- Bakhsh: Central
- Rural District: Hoseyni

Population (2006)
  - Total: 307
- Time zone: UTC+3:30 (IRST)
  - Summer (DST): UTC+4:30 (IRDT)

Chumeh Tupchi Masjid (Persian: چومه توپچي مسجد, also Romanized as Chūmeh Tūpchī Masjid; also known as Chūmeh Tūpchī and Tūpchī) is a village in Hoseyni Rural District, in the Central District of Shadegan County, Khuzestan Province, Iran. At the 2006 census, its population was 307, in 41 families.
