= Ammeh, Khuzestan =

Ammeh عمه
- Village
- Location within Iran
- Coordinates: 30°45′59″N 48°46′55″E
- Country: Iran
- Province: Khuzestan
- County: Shadegan
- Bakhsh: Central
- Rural District: Buzi

Population (2006)
  - Total: 299
- Time zone: UTC+3:30 (IRST)
  - Summer (DST): UTC+4:30 (IRDT)

Ammeh (Persian: عمه, also Romanized as ‘Ammeh and ‘Ameh) is a village in Buzi Rural District, in the Central District of Shadegan County, Khuzestan Province, Iran. At the 2006 census, its population was 299, in 58 families.
