= Shakheh-ye Jadid =

Shakheh-ye Jadid شاخه جديد
- Village
- Location within Iran
- Coordinates: 30°42′21″N 48°41′12″E
- Country: Iran
- Province: Khuzestan
- County: Shadegan
- Bakhsh: Central
- Rural District: Hoseyni

Population (2006)
  - Total: 30
- Time zone: UTC+3:30 (IRST)
  - Summer (DST): UTC+4:30 (IRDT)

Shakheh-ye Jadid (Persian: شاخه جديد, also Romanized as Shākheh-ye Jadīd) is a village in Hoseyni Rural District, in the Central District of Shadegan County, Khuzestan Province, Iran. At the 2006 census, its population was 30, in 4 families.
