= Hodbeh =

Hodbeh or Hadbeh (Persian: حدبه) may refer to:

- Hadbeh, Shadegan
- Hodbeh, Khanafereh
- Hadbeh, alternate name of Nahr-e Jadid
