= Chumeh-ye Seyyed Alvan =

Chumeh-ye Seyyed Alvan چومه سيدعلوان
- Village
- Location within Iran
- Coordinates: 30°39′40″N 48°40′25″E
- Country: Iran
- Province: Khuzestan
- County: Shadegan
- Bakhsh: Central
- Rural District: Hoseyni

Population (2006)
  - Total: 3,132
- Time zone: UTC+3:30 (IRST)
  - Summer (DST): UTC+4:30 (IRDT)

Chumeh-ye Seyyed Alvan (Persian: چومه سيدعلوان, also Romanized as Chūmeh-ye Seyyed Alvān) is a village in Hoseyni Rural District, in the Central District of Shadegan County, Khuzestan Province, Iran. At the 2006 census, its population was 3,132, in 577 families.
