= Shakheh-ye Mobaderi =

Shakheh-ye Mobaderi شاخه مبادري
- Village
- Location within Iran
- Coordinates: 30°42′16″N 48°41′39″E
- Country: Iran
- Province: Khuzestan
- County: Shadegan
- Bakhsh: Central
- Rural District: Hoseyni

Population (2006)
  - Total: 92
- Time zone: UTC+3:30 (IRST)
  - Summer (DST): UTC+4:30 (IRDT)

Shakheh-ye Mobaderi (Persian: شاخه مبادري, also Romanized as Shākheh-ye Nobāderī) is a village in Hoseyni Rural District, in the Central District of Shadegan County, Khuzestan Province, Iran. At the 2006 census, its population was 92, in 17 families.
