= Shakheh-ye Ghanem =

Shakheh-ye Ghanem شاخه غانم
- Village
- Location within Iran
- Coordinates: 30°42′43″N 48°45′46″E
- Country: Iran
- Province: Khuzestan
- County: Shadegan
- Bakhsh: Central
- Rural District: Buzi

Population (2006)
  - Total: 126
- Time zone: UTC+3:30 (IRST)
  - Summer (DST): UTC+4:30 (IRDT)

Shakheh-ye Ghanem (Persian: شاخه غانم, also Romanized as Shākheh-ye Ghānem; also known as Shākheh) is a village in Buzi Rural District, in the Central District of Shadegan County, Khuzestan Province, Iran. At the 2006 census, its population was 126, in 20 families.
