= Hodbeh, Khanafereh =

Hadabeh حدبه
- Village
- Location within Iran
- Coordinates: 30°37′35″N 48°34′12″E
- Country: Iran
- Province: Khuzestan
- County: Shadegan
- Bakhsh: Khanafereh
- Rural District: Salami

Population (2006)
  - Total: 603
- Time zone: UTC+3:30 (IRST)
  - Summer (DST): UTC+4:30 (IRDT)

Hadabeh (Persian: حدبه, also Romanized as Ḩadabeh) is a village in Salami Rural District, Khanafereh District, Shadegan County, Khuzestan Province, Iran. At the 2006 census, its population was 603, in 61 families.
