= Nahr-e Mosallam =

Nahr-e Mosallam نهرمسلم
- Village
- Location within Iran
- Coordinates: 30°38′42″N 48°45′58″E
- Country: Iran
- Province: Khuzestan
- County: Shadegan
- Bakhsh: Central
- Rural District: Buzi

Population (2006)
  - Total: 1,521
- Time zone: UTC+3:30 (IRST)
  - Summer (DST): UTC+4:30 (IRDT)

Nahr-e Mosallam (Persian: نهرمسلم) is a village in Buzi Rural District, in the Central District of Shadegan County, Khuzestan Province, Iran. At the 2006 census, its population was 1,521, in 280 families.
