= Ammeh =

Ammeh and Ameh (Persian: عمه) may refer to:

- Ammeh, Kermanshah
- Ammeh, Khuzestan
- Ada Ameh (1974–2022), Nigerian actress
