= Buzi, Iran =

Buzi (Persian: بوزي), in Iran, may refer to:

- Buzi-ye Bala
- Buzi-ye Seyf
- Buzi Rural District
