= Shobeyshi =

Shobeyshi (Persian: شبيشي) may refer to:

- Shobeyshi-ye Bozorg
- Shobeyshi-ye Kuchak
