= Buzi (disambiguation) =

Buzi is the father of Ezekiel the priest in the Hebrew Bible.

== People ==
- Bu Shang, also known as Buzi (Master Bu)
- Buzi, a character in the Final Fantasy Legend III video game

== Places ==
- Buzi, Iran (disambiguation), multiple places in Iran
- Búzi, a town in Mozambique
- Buzi District, a district in Mozambique
- Buzi River (Mozambique)
- Buzi River (Taiwan)
- Buzi, an island in the Comoros

== Others ==
- Buzi (fortification), a type of fortification in China
- Bŭzi, a mandarin square or rank badge worn by scholar-bureaucrats in the Chinese, Korean, and Vietnamese imperial/royal courts
