= Sowdeh-ye Olya =

Sowdeh-ye Olya سوده عليا
- Village
- Location within Iran
- Coordinates: 30°41′35″N 48°47′19″E
- Country: Iran
- Province: Khuzestan
- County: Shadegan
- Bakhsh: Central
- Rural District: Buzi

Population (2006)
  - Total: 329
- Time zone: UTC+3:30 (IRST)
  - Summer (DST): UTC+4:30 (IRDT)

Sowdeh-ye Olya (Persian: سوده عليا, also Romanized as Sowdeh-ye ‘Olyā; also known as Sowdā-ye Bālā, Sowdā-ye ‘Olyā, Sowdeh, and Sowdeh-ye Bālā) is a village in Buzi Rural District, in the Central District of Shadegan County, Khuzestan Province, Iran. At the 2006 census, its population was 329, in 64 families.
