= Khorusi-ye Shomali =

Khorusi-ye Shomali خروسي شمالي
- Village
- Location within Iran
- Coordinates: 30°37′24″N 48°37′16″E
- Country: Iran
- Province: Khuzestan
- County: Shadegan
- Bakhsh: Khanafereh
- Rural District: Naseri

Population (2006)
  - Total: 1,193
- Time zone: UTC+3:30 (IRST)
  - Summer (DST): UTC+4:30 (IRDT)

Khorusi-ye Shomali (Persian: خروسي شمالي, also Romanized as Khorūsī-ye Shomālī; also known as Khorūs-e Shomālī) is a village in Naseri Rural District, Khanafereh District, Shadegan County, Khuzestan Province, Iran. At the 2006 census, its population was 1,193, in 217 families.
