= Chumeh-ye Kuchak =

Chumeh-ye Kuchak چومه كوچك
- Village
- Location within Iran
- Coordinates: 30°41′02″N 48°41′11″E
- Country: Iran
- Province: Khuzestan
- County: Shadegan
- Bakhsh: Central
- Rural District: Hoseyni

Population (2006)
  - Total: 260
- Time zone: UTC+3:30 (IRST)
  - Summer (DST): UTC+4:30 (IRDT)

Chumeh-ye Kuchak (Persian: چومه كوچك, also Romanized as Chūmeh-ye Kūchak) is a village in Hoseyni Rural District, in the Central District of Shadegan County, Khuzestan Province, Iran. At the 2006 census, its population was 260, in 30 families.
