= Shobeyshi-ye Kuchak =

Shobeyshi-ye Kuchak شبيشي كوچك
- Village
- Location within Iran
- Coordinates: 30°41′53″N 48°38′28″E
- Country: Iran
- Province: Khuzestan
- County: Shadegan
- Bakhsh: Central
- Rural District: Jaffal

Population (2006)
  - Total: 610
- Time zone: UTC+3:30 (IRST)
  - Summer (DST): UTC+4:30 (IRDT)

Shobeyshi-ye Kuchak (Persian: شبيشي كوچك, also Romanized as Shobeyshī-ye Kūchak) is a village in Jaffal Rural District, in the Central District of Shadegan County, Khuzestan Province, Iran. At the 2006 census, its population was 610, in 106 families.
