= Emam-e Seh =

Village in Khuzestan province, Iran

Emam-e Seh Persian: امام سه
- Village
- Location within Iran
- Coordinates: 30°43′05″N 48°38′54″E
- Country: Iran
- Province: Khuzestan
- County: Shadegan
- District: Central
- Rural District: Jaffal

Population (2016)
  - Total: 1,834
- Time zone: UTC+3:30 (IRST)

Emam-e Seh (Persian: امام سه) (Note: Also romanized as Emām-e Seh) is a village in Jaffal Rural District of the Central District of Shadegan County, Khuzestan province, Iran.

== Demographics ==
=== Population ===
At the time of the 2006 National Census, the village's population was 1,404 in 227 households. The following census in 2011 counted 1,708 people in 405 households. The 2016 census measured the population of the village as 1,834 people in 445 households. It was the most populous village in its rural district.
