= Mahrugi-ye Sofla =

Mahrugi-ye Sofla محروگي سفلي
- Village
- Location within Iran
- Coordinates: 30°38′12″N 48°45′01″E
- Country: Iran
- Province: Khuzestan
- County: Shadegan
- Bakhsh: Central
- Rural District: Buzi

Population (2006)
  - Total: 360
- Time zone: UTC+3:30 (IRST)
  - Summer (DST): UTC+4:30 (IRDT)

Mahrugi-ye Sofla (Persian: محروگي سفلي, also Romanized as Maḩrūgī-ye Soflá; also known as Maḩrūqī-ye Soflá) is a village in Buzi Rural District, in the Central District of Shadegan County, Khuzestan Province, Iran. At the 2006 census, its population was 360, in 61 families.
