= Khorusi =

Khorusi (Persian: خروسي) may refer to:

- Khorusi-ye Jonubi
- Khorusi-ye Shomali
