= Sowdeh =

Sowdeh (Persian: سوده), also rendered as Sowda, may refer to:

- Sowdeh-ye Olya
- Sowdeh-ye Sofla
