= Mahrugi =

Mahrugi (Persian: محروگي), also rendered as Mahruqi, may refer to:

- Mahrugi-ye Olya
- Mahrugi-ye Sofla
