= Ghoreybeh =

Village in Khuzestan province, Iran

Ghoreybeh Persian: غرايبه
- Village
- Location within Iran
- Coordinates: 30°47′50″N 48°47′44″E
- Country: Iran
- Province: Khuzestan
- County: Shadegan
- District: Central
- Rural District: Hoseyni

Population (2016)
  - Total: 434
- Time zone: UTC+3:30 (IRST)

Ghoreybeh (Persian: غرايبه) (Note: Also romanized as Gharaibeh, Gharībeh, and Ghoraibeh; also known as Nahr-e Ghereybeh, Nahr-e Ghoreybeh, Qarīheh, Qaşabeh, Qoreybe‘, Qoreybeh, and Qusibeh) is a village in, and the capital of, Hoseyni Rural District of the Central District of Shadegan County, Khuzestan province, Iran.

== Demographics ==
=== Population ===
At the time of the 2006 National Census, the village's population was 468 in 76 households. The following census in 2011 counted 440 people in 89 households. The 2016 census measured the population of the village as 434 people in 128 households.
