= Buzi River =

Buzi River may refer to:

- Buzi River (Mozambique)
- Buzi River (Taiwan)
