= Jaffal, Khuzestan =

Village in Khuzestan province, Iran

Jaffal Persian: جفال
- Village
- Location within Iran
- Coordinates: 30°44′16″N 48°39′53″E
- Country: Iran
- Province: Khuzestan
- County: Shadegan
- District: Central
- Rural District: Jaffal

Population (2016)
  - Total: 808
- Time zone: UTC+3:30 (IRST)

Jaffal (Persian: جفال) (Note: Also romanized as Jaffāl) is a village in, and the capital of, Jaffal Rural District of the Central District of Shadegan County, Khuzestan province, Iran.

== Demographics ==
=== Population ===
At the time of the 2006 National Census, the village's population was 454 in 66 households. The following census in 2011 counted 749 people in 172 households. The 2016 census measured the population of the village as 808 people in 295 households.
