= Shakheh-ye Albu Shahbaz =

Shakheh-ye Albu Shahbaz شاخه البوشهباز
- Village
- Location within Iran
- Coordinates: 30°43′37″N 48°39′24″E
- Country: Iran
- Province: Khuzestan
- County: Shadegan
- Bakhsh: Central
- Rural District: Jaffal

Population (2006)
  - Total: 135
- Time zone: UTC+3:30 (IRST)
  - Summer (DST): UTC+4:30 (IRDT)

Shakheh-ye Albu Shahbaz (Persian: شاخه البوشهباز, also Romanized as Shākheh-ye Ālbū Shahbāz; also known as Shākheh-ye Pā’īn) is a village in Jaffal Rural District, in the Central District of Shadegan County, Khuzestan Province, Iran. At the 2006 census, its population was 135, in 28 families.
