= Buzi-ye Bala =

Village in Khuzestan province, Iran

Buzi-ye Bala Persian: بوزي بالا
- Village
- Location within Iran
- Coordinates: 30°39′56″N 48°43′05″E
- Country: Iran
- Province: Khuzestan
- County: Shadegan
- District: Central
- Rural District: Buzi

Population (2016)
  - Total: 257
- Time zone: UTC+3:30 (IRST)

Buzi-ye Bala (Persian: بوزي بالا) (Note: Also romanized as Būzī-ye Bālā; also known as Būzī-ye ‘Olyā) is a village in, and the capital of, Buzi Rural District of the Central District of Shadegan County, Khuzestan province, Iran.

== Demographics ==
=== Population ===
At the time of the 2006 National Census, the village's population was 248 in 42 households. The following census in 2011 counted 269 people in 61 households. The 2016 census measured the population of the village as 257 people in 64 households.
