= Shakheh-ye Sofla =

Shakheh-ye Sofla شاخه سفلي
- Village
- Location within Iran
- Coordinates: 30°43′24″N 48°40′09″E
- Country: Iran
- Province: Khuzestan
- County: Shadegan
- Bakhsh: Central
- Rural District: Buzi

Population (2006)
  - Total: 248
- Time zone: UTC+3:30 (IRST)
  - Summer (DST): UTC+4:30 (IRDT)

Shakheh-ye Sofla (Persian: شاخه سفلي, also Romanized as Shākheh-ye Soflá; also known as Shākheh-ye Pā‘īn) is a village in Buzi Rural District, in the Central District of Shadegan County, Khuzestan Province, Iran. At the 2006 census, its population was 248, in 55 families.
