= Joghghal-e Aviyeh =

Joghghal-e Aviyeh جغال عويه
- Village
- Location within Iran
- Coordinates: 30°44′27″N 48°39′51″E
- Country: Iran
- Province: Khuzestan
- County: Shadegan
- Bakhsh: Central
- Rural District: Jaffal

Population (2006)
  - Total: 568
- Time zone: UTC+3:30 (IRST)
  - Summer (DST): UTC+4:30 (IRDT)

Joghghal-e Aviyeh (Persian: جغال عويه, also Romanized as Joghghāl-e ʿAvīyeh; also known as Jafār, Jafār-e Pā’īn, Jaffāl-e Pā’īn, and Joghghāl-e Soflá) is a village in Jaffal Rural District, in the Central District of Shadegan County, Khuzestan Province, Iran. At the 2006 census, its population was 568, in 75 families.
