= Shadegan =

City in Khuzestan province, Iran

Shadegan Persian: شادگان
- City
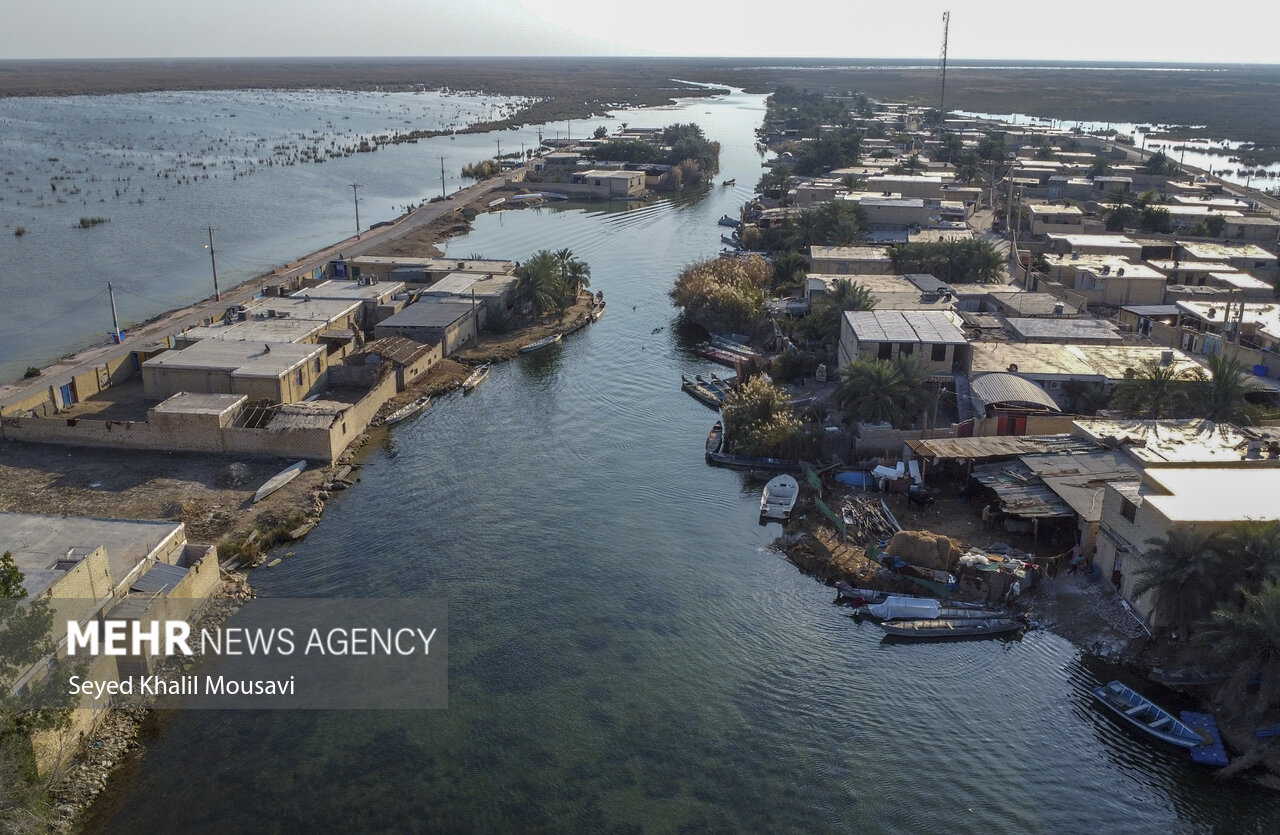
- News photo of buildings bordering the Shadegan Ponds

- Location within Iran
- Coordinates: 30°38′57″N 48°39′55″E
- Country: Iran
- Province: Khuzestan
- County: Shadegan
- District: Central

Population (2016)
  - Total: 41,733
- Time zone: UTC+3:30 (IRST)

Shadegan (Persian: شادگان) (Note: Also romanized as Shādgān and Shādegān; formerly Fallehiyeh, also romanized as Fallāḩīyeh (فلاحية); also known as Fallābīyeh and formerly also "Soroq") is a city in the Central District of Shadegan County, Khuzestan province, Iran, serving as capital of both the county and the district. The city is located on the Jarahi River, which empties into the adjacent Shadegan International Wetlands.

== Demographics ==
=== Population ===
At the time of the 2006 National Census, the city's population was 48,642 in 8,600 households. The following census in 2011 counted 52,786 people in 12,088 households. The 2016 census measured the population of the city as 41,733 people in 11,404 households.

== Gallery ==
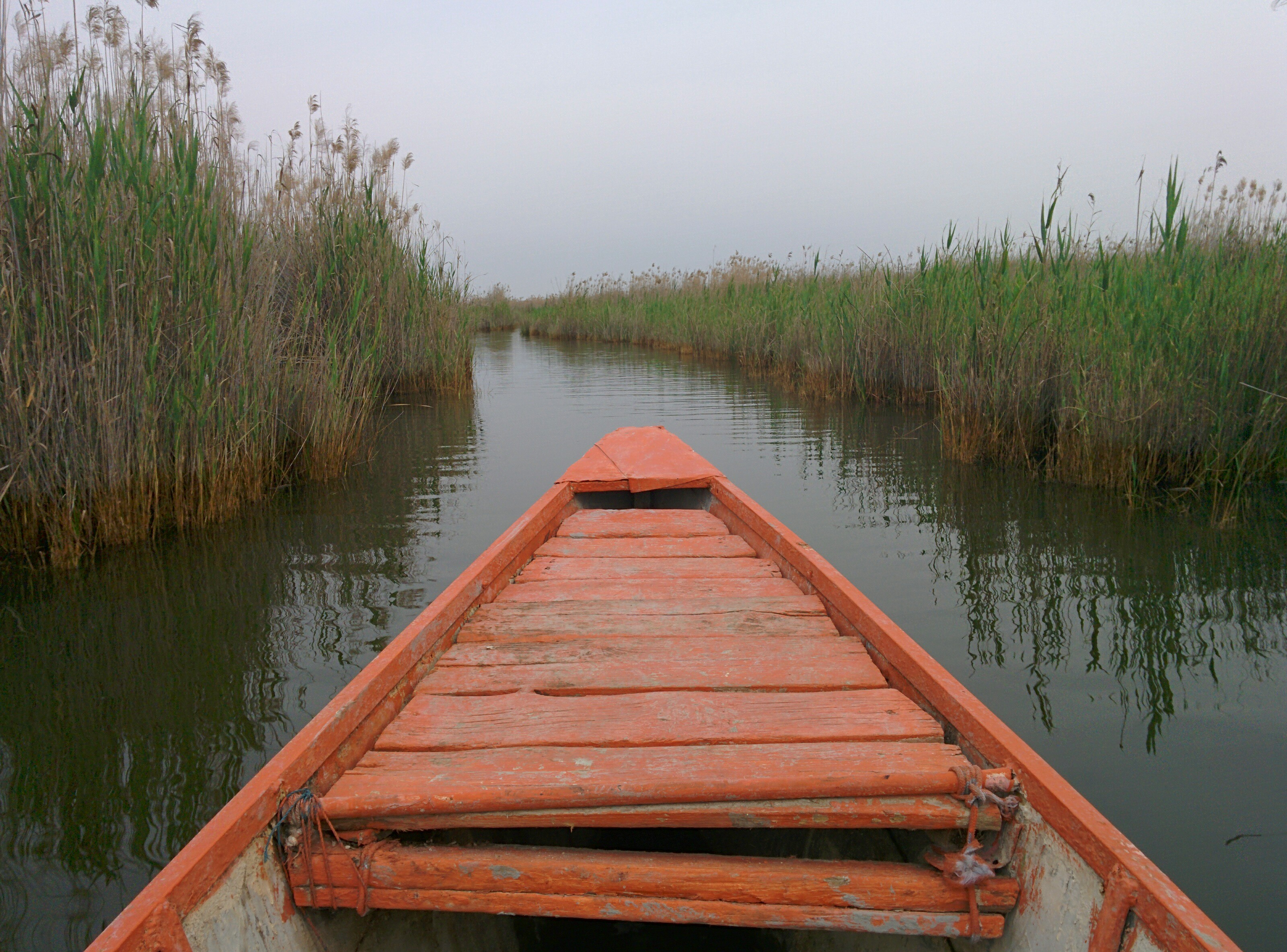
A boat traversing the Shadegan International Wetlands

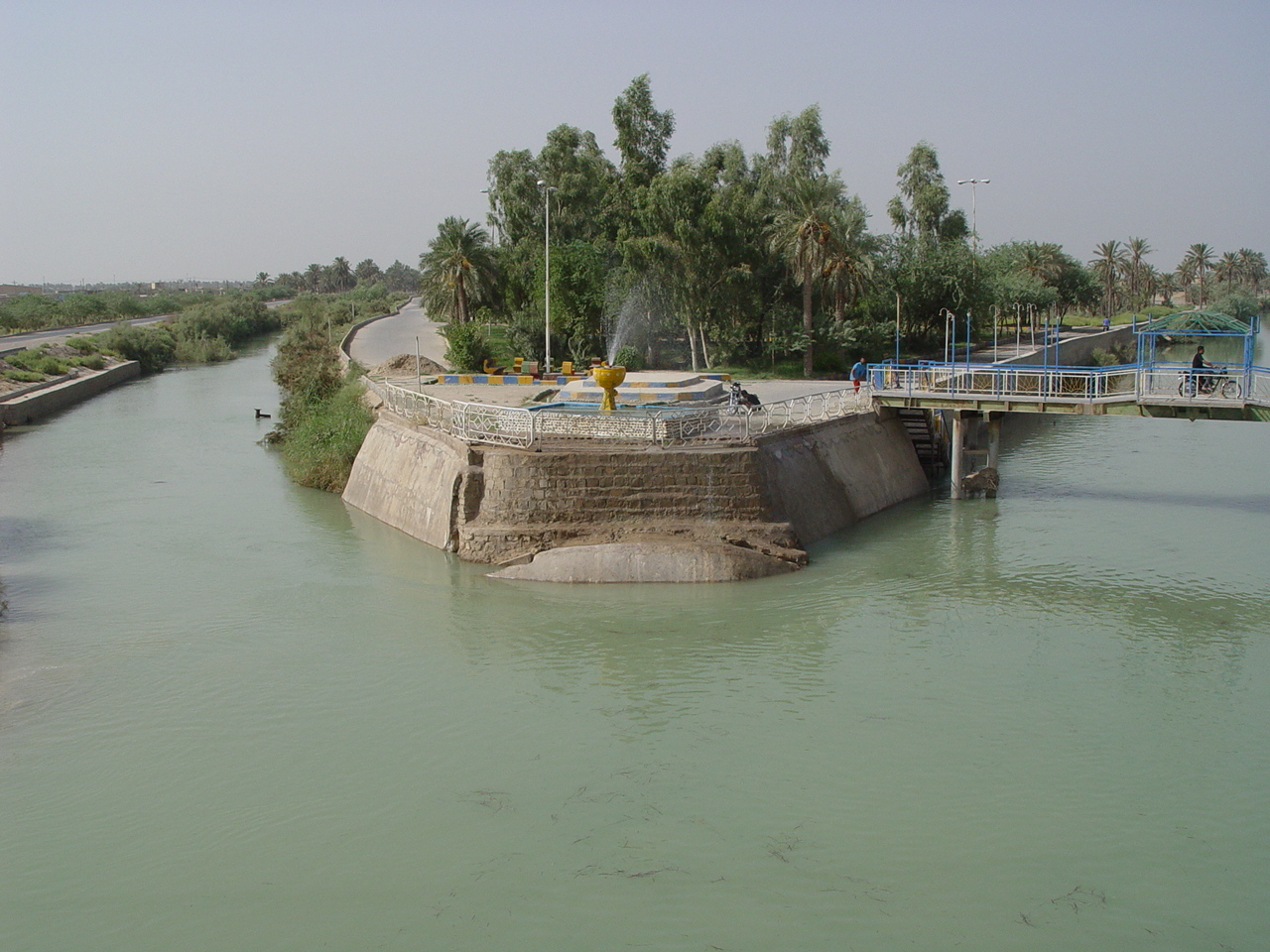
A bifurcation of the Jarahi River located in northern Shadegan

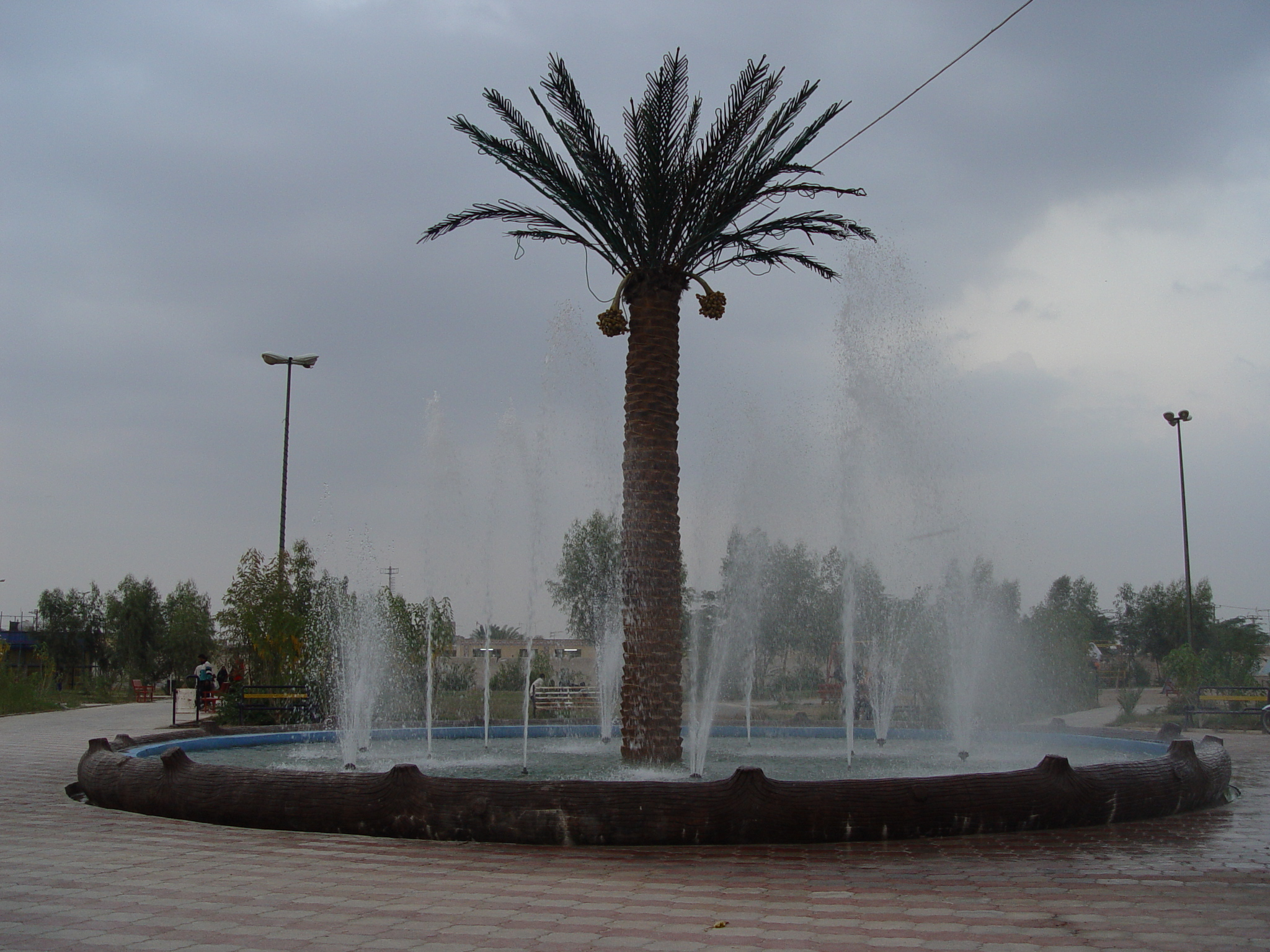
A fountain in an urban park in southern Shadegan

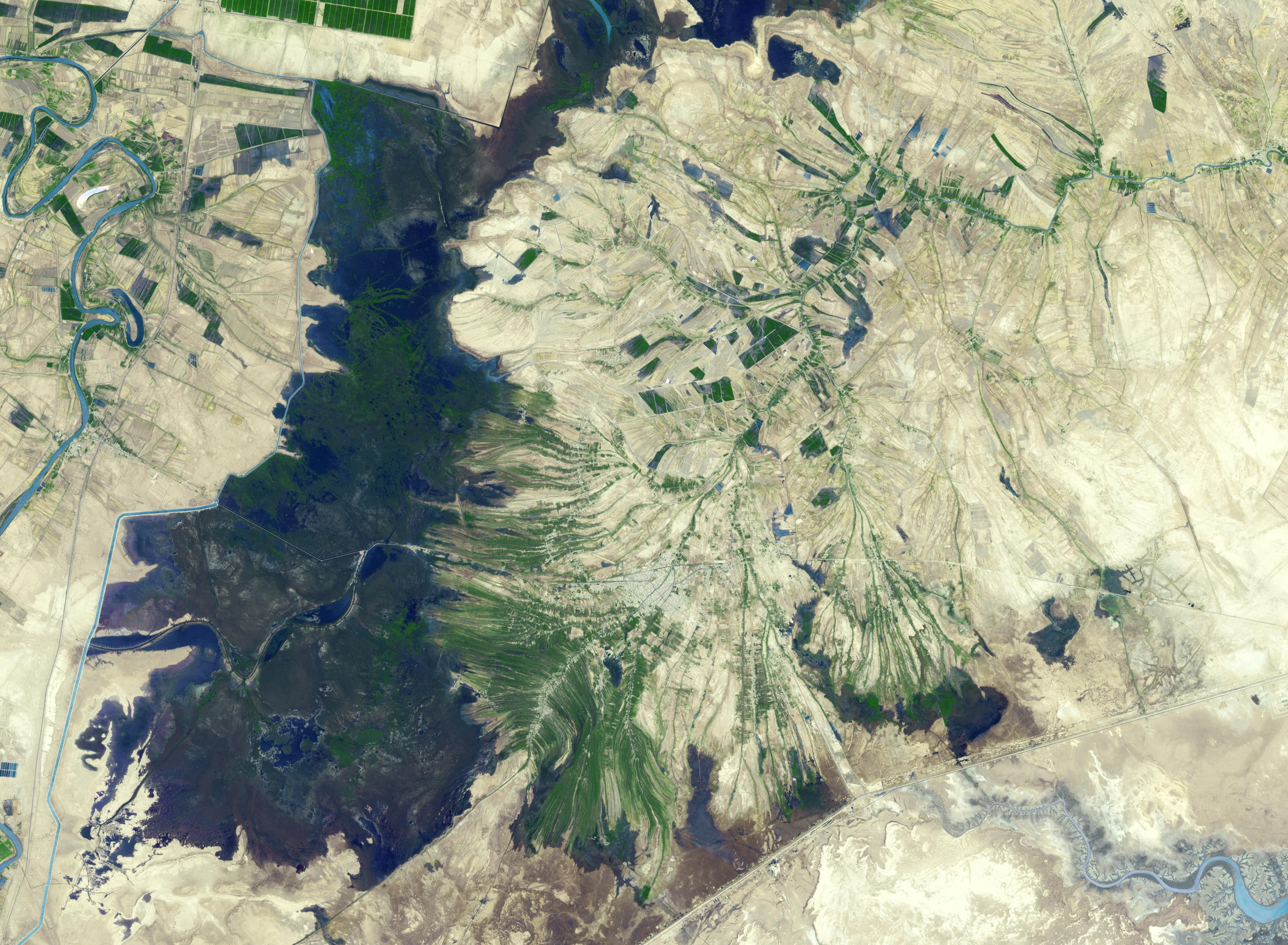
Satellite view of Shadegan

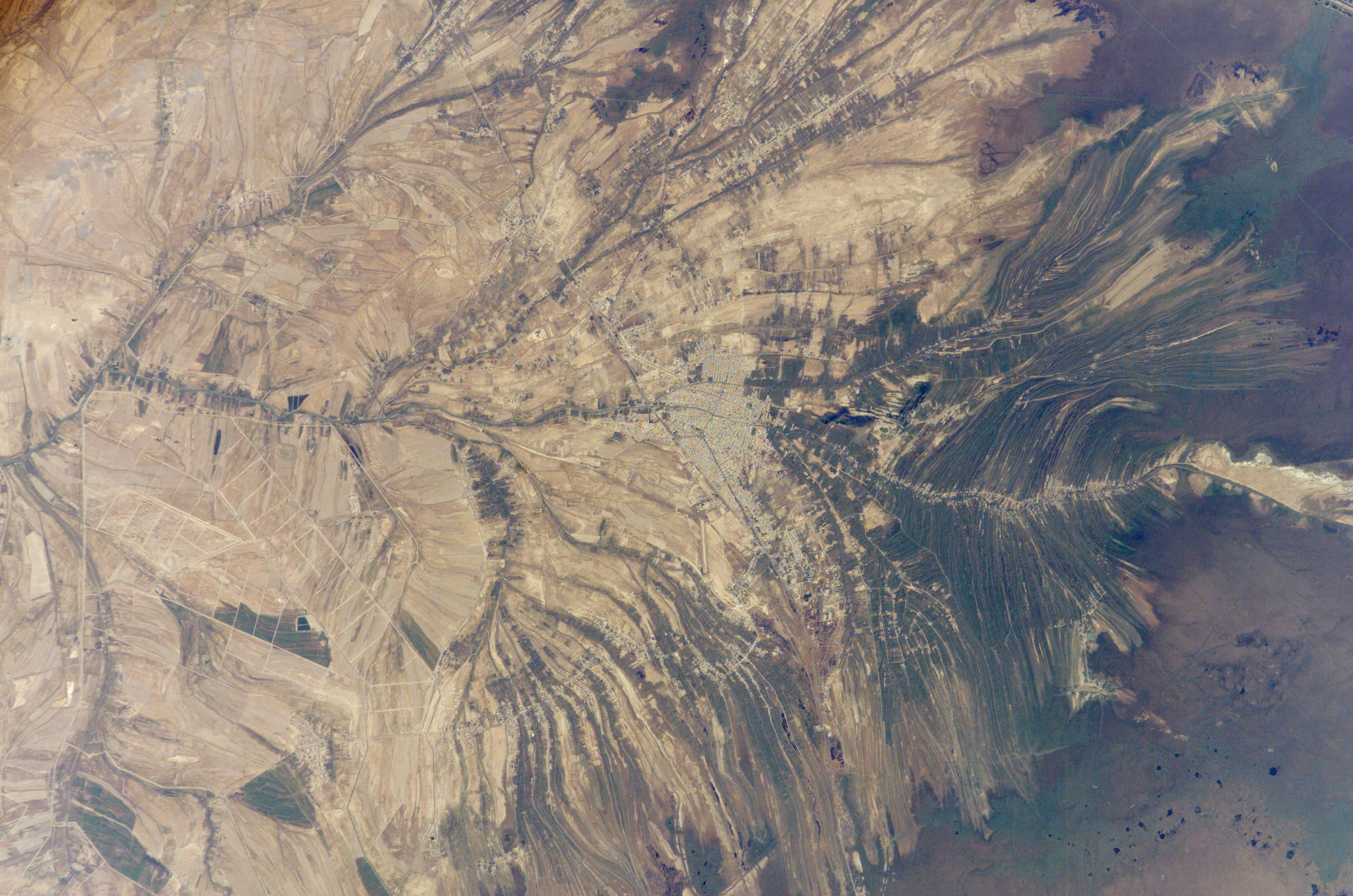
ISS satellite view of Shadegan (centre right), and the Jarahi (centre left). (Up is south-east.)

== See also ==
Shadegan Ponds
