= Dali River =

River in Taichung, Taiwan

- Native name: 大里溪 (Chinese)

Location
- Country: Taiwan
- City: Taichung

Physical characteristics
- Source: Dakeng River
  - location: Erkeshan, Beitun District
- 2nd source: Buzi River
  - location: Toukeshan, Beitun District
- Mouth: Dadu River
  - location: Changhua City
  - coordinates: 24.1008°N 120.6039°E
- Length: 35.4 km
- Basin size: 400.7 km^{2}

Basin features
- River system: Dadu River
- Tributaries
  - left: Toubiankeng River, Caohu River
  - right: Han River, Jiouhan River

The Dali River (Chinese: 大里溪; pinyin: Dàlǐxī) is a river located in Taichung, Taiwan, flowing from the west of the city in a southwest direction before emptying into the Dadu River.

Since the river is prone to flooding after heavy rain, the course of the river has been significantly altered. Currently, the Dali River begins in Dakeng, Beitun District at the end of the Dakeng River, and merges into the Buzi River at Buzi, Beitun District. The Buzi River then turns back into the Dali River in Taiping District near Xinfeng Bridge, passing through Dali, Wufeng, and Wuri before emptying into the Dadu River at Taichung's border with Changhua.

== Construction history ==
The Water Resources Agency first proposed a series of construction along the Dali River in the 1960s due to flood concerns, but the proposals saw local opposition and was never carried out. On July 2, 1984, Taichung was hit with a major flood along the Dali River, highlighting the need for preventive measures. Construction began in 1989 and lasted until 2016, which was met with opposition due to land acquisition, since the river needed to be widened and levees to be constructed.
