= Han River (Taiwan) =

River in Taichung, Taiwan

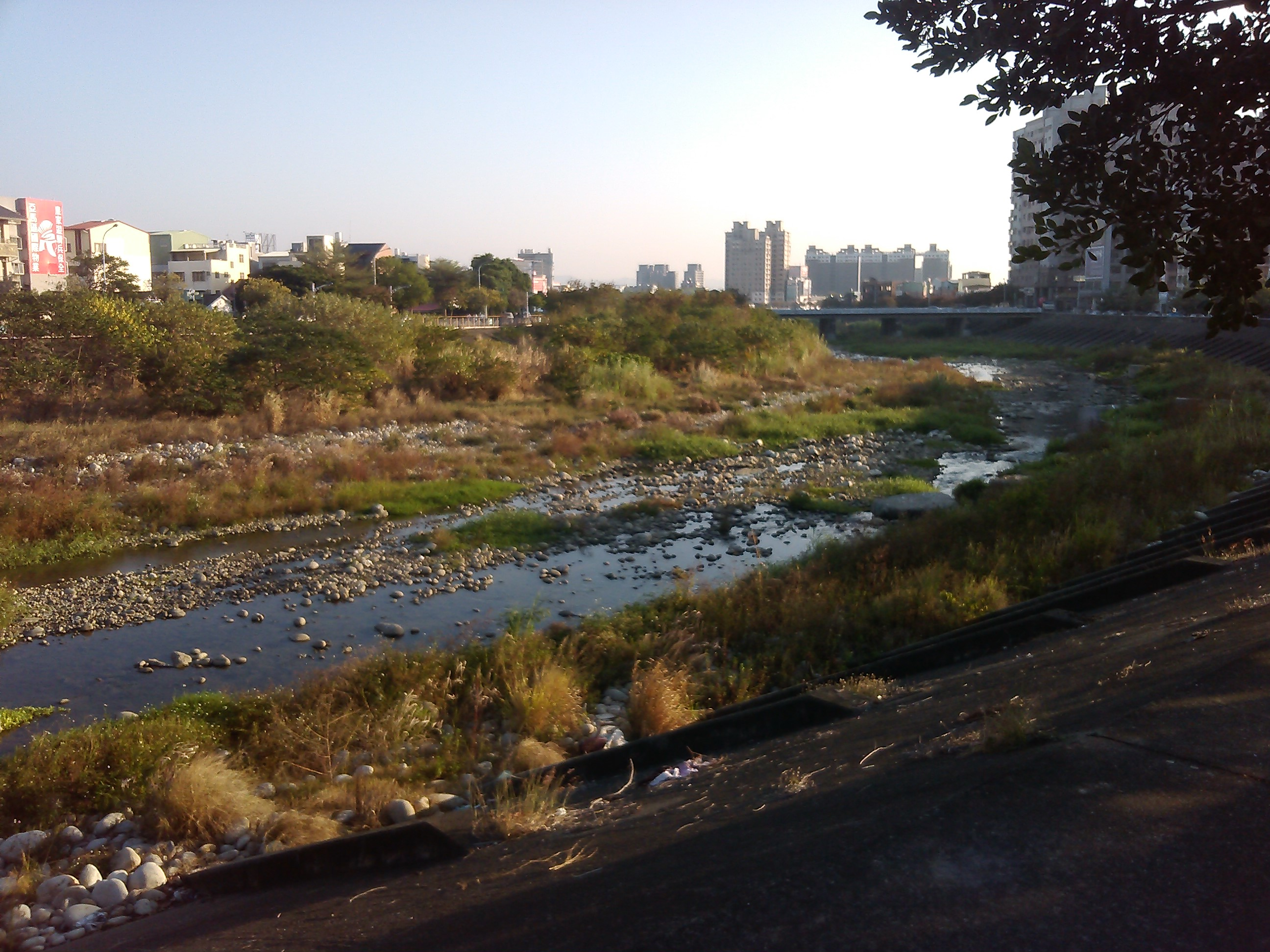
- Native name: 旱溪 (Chinese)

Location
- Country: Taiwan
- City: Taichung

Physical characteristics
- Source: Gonglaoping
  - location: Fengyuan District
  - coordinates: 24.2610°N 120.7663°E
- Mouth: Dali River
  - location: Dali District
  - coordinates: 24.1235°N 120.7028°E
- Length: 33.5 km (20.8 mi)

Basin features
- River system: Dadu River

The Han River (Chinese: 旱溪; pinyin: Hànxī, lit. "dry creek") is a river located in Taichung, Taiwan. The river flows southwards from Gonglaoping in Fengyuan District until it joins the Dali River near Provincial Highway 74 in Dali District.

Even though the river is wide, its relatively low discharge means that the river runs dry for most of the year, hence the name. A bike path known as the "Han River Bike Trail" (旱溪自行車道) runs alongside the river between Fengyuan and Dali.
