= Khanafereh =

City in Khuzestan province, Iran

Khanafereh Persian: خنافره
- City
- Location within Iran
- Coordinates: 30°37′58″N 48°38′01″E
- Country: Iran
- Province: Khuzestan
- County: Shadegan
- District: Khanafereh
- Established as a municipality: 2012

Population (2016)
  - Total: 3,853
- Time zone: UTC+3:30 (IRST)

Khanafereh (Persian: خنافره) (Note: Formerly Khorusi-ye Jonubi (خروسي جنوبي), also romanized as Khorūsī-ye Jonūbī) is a city in, and the capital of, Khanafereh District of Shadegan County, Khuzestan province, Iran. It also serves as the administrative center for Salami Rural District. (Note: Formerly Khanafereh Rural District)

== Demographics ==
=== Population ===
At the time of the 2006 National Census, the population was 3,759 in 609 households, when it was the village of Khorusi-ye Jonubi in Khanafereh Rural District (Note: Renamed Salami Rural District) of the Central District. The following census in 2011 counted 3,633 people in 831 households, by which time the rural district had been separated from the district in the formation of Khanafereh District and renamed Salami Rural District. The 2016 census measured the population as 3,853 people in 958 households, when the village had been elevated to city status as Khanafereh.
