= Shakh Kupal =

Shakh Kupal شاخ كوپال
- Village
- Location within Iran
- Coordinates: 31°16′35″N 49°14′25″E
- Country: Iran
- Province: Khuzestan
- County: Ahvaz
- Bakhsh: Central
- Rural District: Gheyzaniyeh

Population (2006)
  - Total: 327
- Time zone: UTC+3:30 (IRST)
  - Summer (DST): UTC+4:30 (IRDT)

Shakh Kupal (Persian: شاخ كوپال, also Romanized as Shākh Kūpāl; also known as Shākheh and Shakhehé Koopal) is a village in Gheyzaniyeh Rural District, in the Central District of Ahvaz County, Khuzestan Province, Iran. At the 2006 census, its population was 327, in 62 families.
