= Jarahi River =

River in Iran

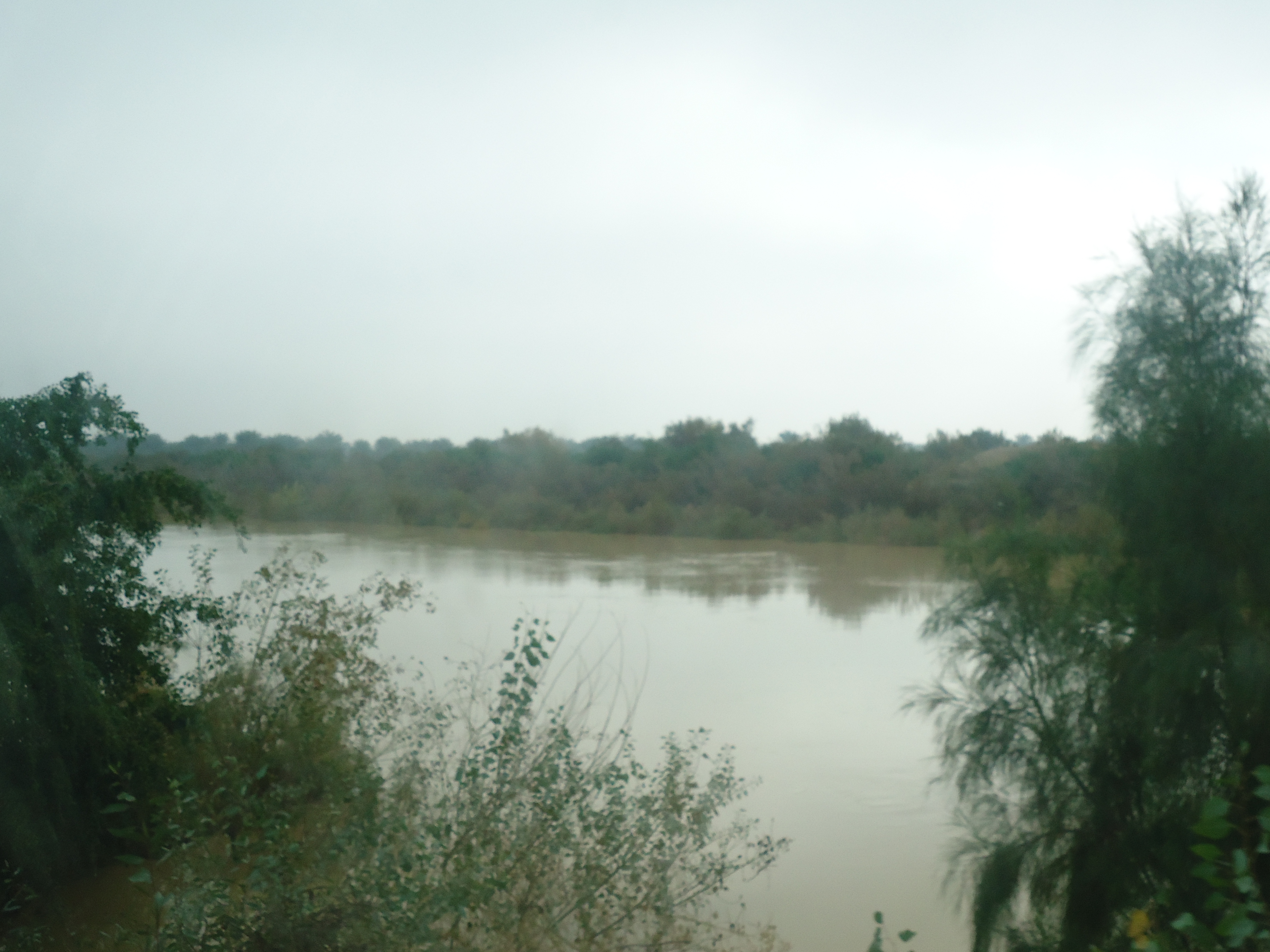
Jarahi River

The Jarahi River (Persian: جراحی), also spelt Jarrahi or Garrahi, is a major river in the Iranian province of Khuzestan. It originates in the southern Zagros mountains, and flowing westward, empties into the Shadegan/Falahhiya marshes.

The river was known as Hedyphon (Greek: Ἡδνφῶν) to the ancient Greeks.
