= Ammeh, Kermanshah =

Ammeh عمه
- Village
- Location within Iran
- Coordinates: 34°16′36″N 47°08′36″E
- Country: Iran
- Province: Kermanshah
- County: Kermanshah
- Bakhsh: Central
- Rural District: Qarah Su

Population (2006)
  - Total: 274
- Time zone: UTC+3:30 (IRST)
  - Summer (DST): UTC+4:30 (IRDT)

Ammeh (Persian: عمه, also Romanized as ‘Ammeh) is a village in Qarah Su Rural District, in the Central District of Kermanshah County, Kermanshah Province, Iran. At the 2006 census, its population was 274, in 52 families.
