= Naseri, Kerman =

Naseri ناصري
- Village
- Location within Iran
- Coordinates: 28°28′58″N 56°54′28″E
- Country: Iran
- Province: Kerman
- County: Arzuiyeh
- Bakhsh: Soghan
- Rural District: Soghan

Population (2006)
  - Total: 61
- Time zone: UTC+3:30 (IRST)
  - Summer (DST): UTC+4:30 (IRDT)

Naseri (Persian: ناصري, also Romanized as Nāşerī) is a village in Soghan Rural District, Soghan District, Arzuiyeh County, Kerman Province, Iran. At the 2006 census, its population was 61, in 17 families.
