= Buzi River (Taiwan) =

River in Taichung, Taiwan

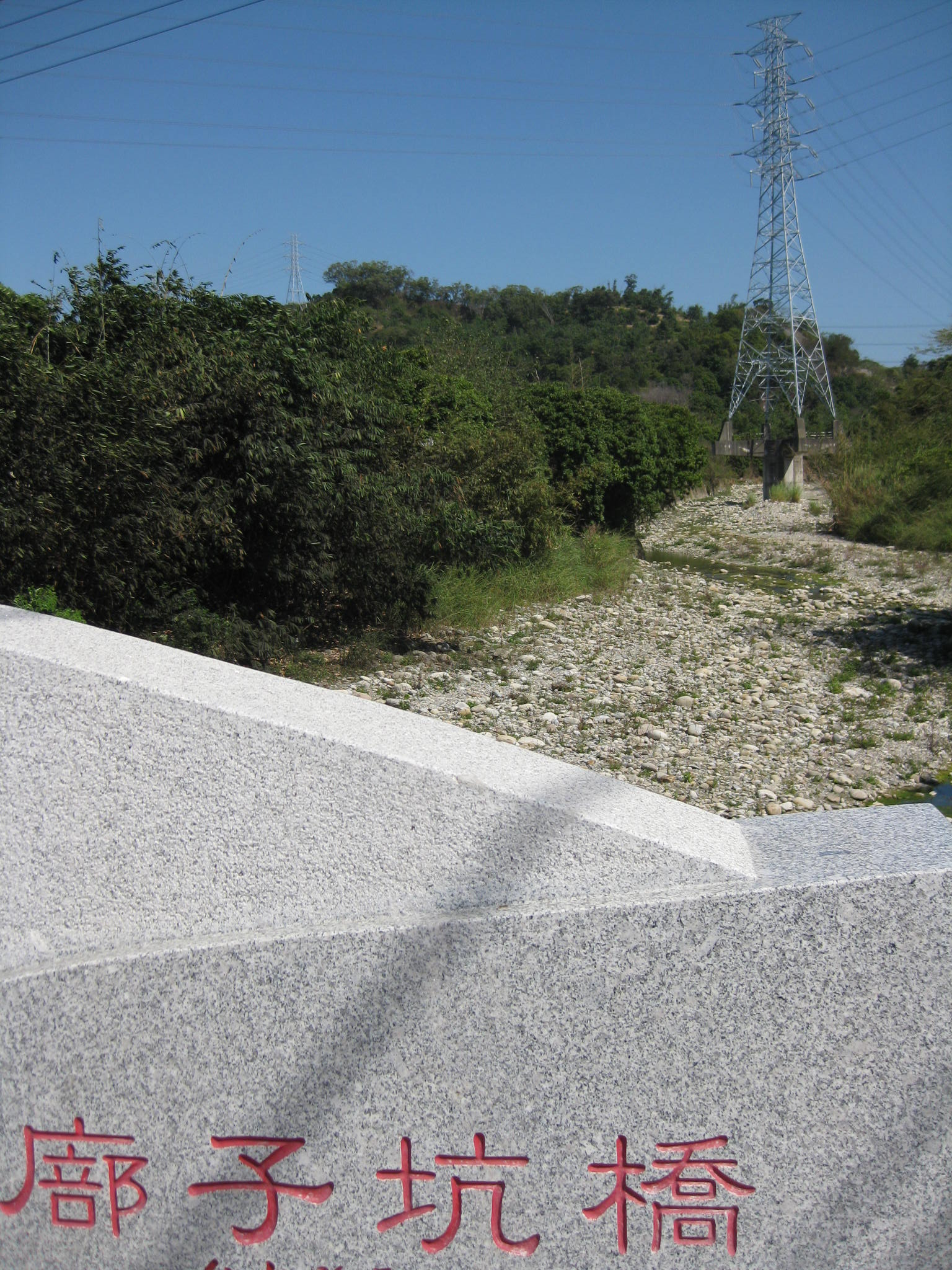
- Native name: 廍子溪 (Chinese)

Location
- Country: Taiwan
- City: Taichung

Physical characteristics
- Source: Toukeshan
  - location: Beitun District
- Mouth: Dali River
  - location: near Xinfeng Bridge, Taiping District
  - coordinates: 24.1425°N 120.7220°E

Basin features
- River system: Dadu River
- Tributaries
  - right: Dali River

The Buzi River (Chinese: 廍子溪 or 部子溪; pinyin: Bùzǐxī), alternatively Buzikeng River (Chinese: 廍仔坑溪; pinyin: Bùzǐkēngxī) is a river located in Taichung, Taiwan. The river flows westward from Toukeshan in Beitun District to near Xinfeng Bridge in Taiping District, where it becomes the Dali River. Even though the Buzi River is considered as a tributary of the Dali River, the Dali River is actually rerouted to merge with the Buzi River further upstream, and the overlapping segment is known as the Buzi River.
