= Takhtshah-e Pain =

Takhtshah-e Pain تخت شه پایین
- Village
- Location within Iran
- Coordinates: 32°42′15″N 48°15′46″E
- Country: Iran
- Province: Khuzestan
- County: Andimeshk
- Bakhsh: Alvar-e Garmsiri
- Rural District: Hoseyniyeh

Population (2006)
  - Total: 25
- Time zone: UTC+3:30 (IRST)
  - Summer (DST): UTC+4:30 (IRDT)

Takhtshah-e Pain (Persian: تخت شه پایین, also Romanized as Takhtshah-e Pā’īn; also known as Shakheh-ye Pā’īn) is a village in Hoseyniyeh Rural District, Alvar-e Garmsiri District, Andimeshk County, Khuzestan Province, Iran. At the 2006 census, its population was 25, in 7 families.
