= Naceri =

Naceri (also spelled Naseri, or Nasseri, Arabic: ناصري, Persian: ناصری) is an Arabic and Iranian surname, it may refer to:

- Mehran Karimi Nasseri (born 1942), Iranian refugee
- Mohammad Ashraf Naseri, Afghan governor
- Samy Naceri (born 1961), French actor
