= Shadegan Ponds =

Wetland in Iran

Designations

Ramsar Wetland
- Official name: Shadegan Marshes & mudflats of Khor-al Amaya & Khor Musa
- Designated: 23 June 1975
- Reference no.: 41

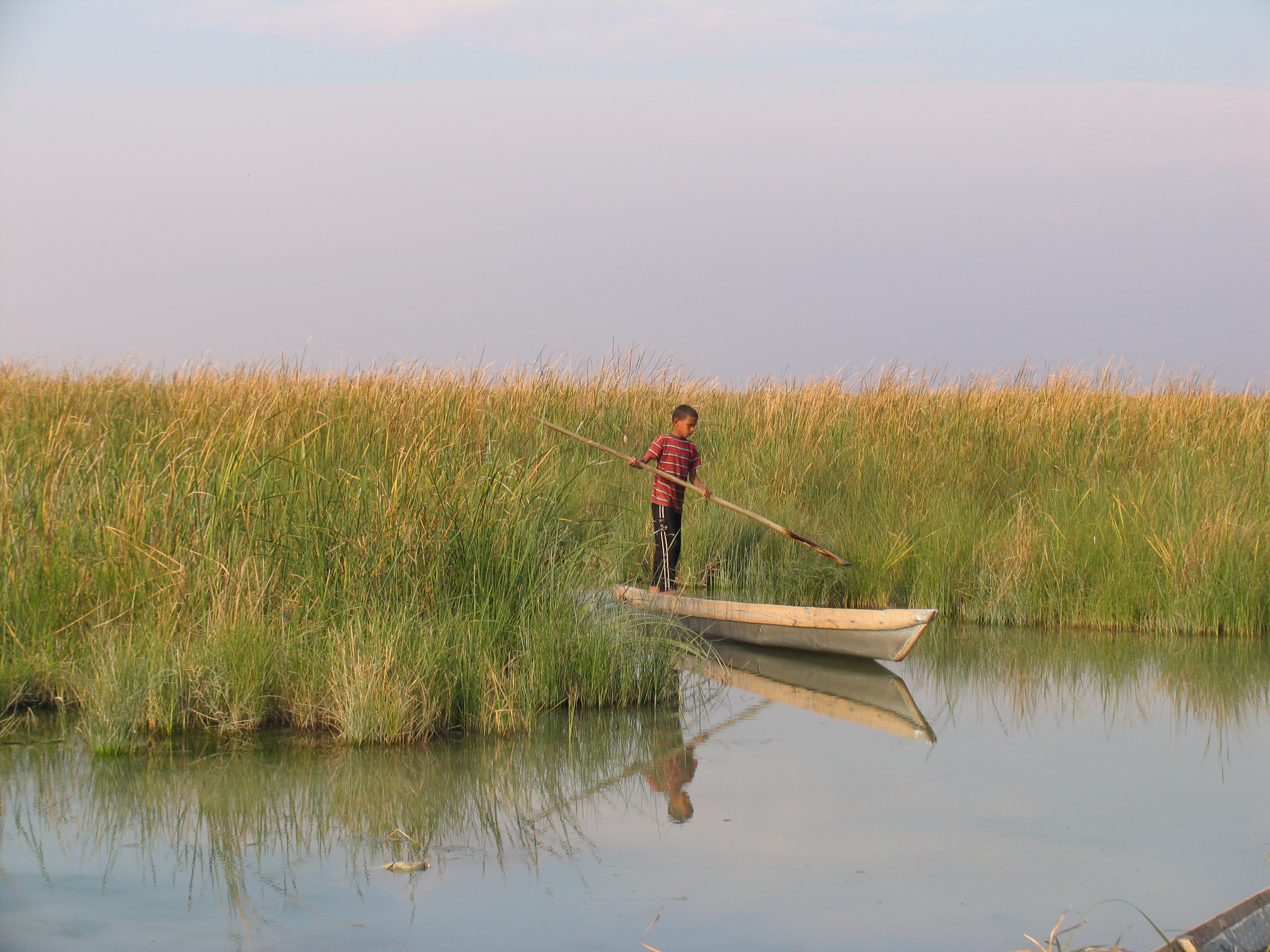

The Shadegan International Wetland (Persian: تالاب شادگان) is a series of Ramsar wetlands, which is a designation given to wetlands of international importance under the Ramsar Convention. It covering about 400,000 hectares in Khuzestan Province, Iran. The ponds and surrounding marshes are fed by the Karun river and are connected to the Persian Gulf. The soil surrounding the wetlands is saturated with groundwater and the wetlands themselves are calm and a rich habitat for wildlife.

Animal life in the Shadegan ponds include two species of amphibians, five species of reptiles and 154 species of birds, among them pelican and flamingo. And several types of ducks, terns, gulls, and egrets, can be found in Shadegan Wildlife Refuge. Shadegan also supports about 10,000 to 20,000 diving ducks in winter, about half the world's population. The area is also known for its birds of prey and is very important to migratory birds. There are also 40 species of mammals present, among them the Iranian wolf, river otter, jungle cat and wild boar.

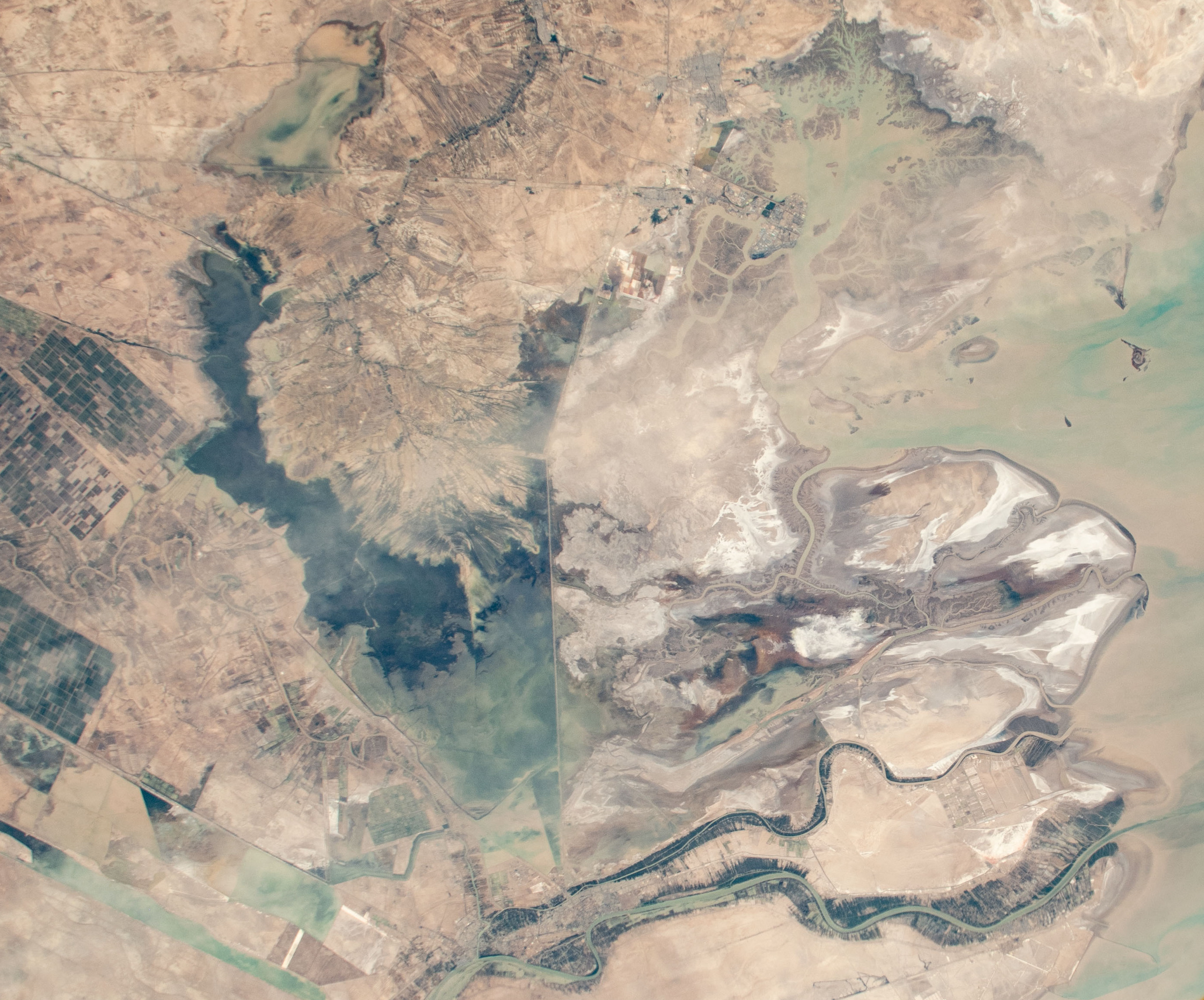
Shadegan marshes and mudflats, wetlands and road to Abadan, Abadan Island, Bahmanshir river

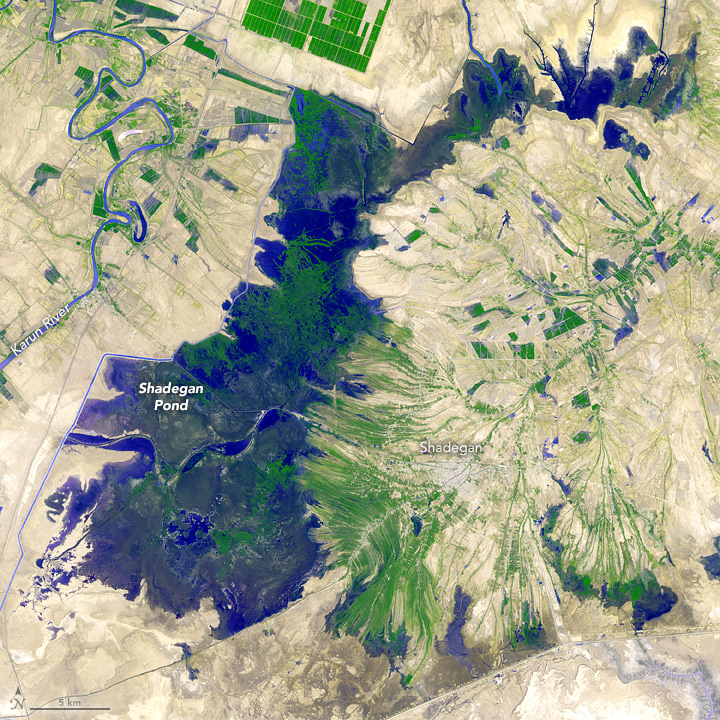
NASA satellite picture on September 3, 2012, Shadegan Pond, town Shadegan and agricultural land

The area suffers from pollution from leaking oil pipes, industrial waste and agricultural fertilisers. However, the economic dependence and income generated from this wetland is immense, most of values are either ignored or underestimated in policy related decisions. Given the diversity of social, economic, and environmental benefits that derive from the Shadegan International Wetland, strong opinion exists that people, especially those living around the wetland, are dependent on wetland and gain long-term benefit from this ecosystem. Therefore, one major role of wetland management which is to estimate the value of various aspects of a wetland should not ignored.

== Drainage basin ==
Environmental conditions at the wetland vary throughout the year. In the fall and winter, rains in the Zagros Mountains send water flooding through an intricate series of shallow lagoons and marshes. Many of these areas dry out during the summer months. Also The delta is fed by overflow channels of the Karun river, irrigation canals and local rainfall and is bordered by salt flats, rice fields, date palms and human settlements.

== Environmental conditions ==
Environmental conditions at the wetlands vary throughout the year. In the fall and winter, rains in the Zagros Mountains send water flooding through an intricate series of shallow lagoons and marshes.
