= Naseri Rural District =

Rural district in Khuzestan province, Iran

Naseri Rural District Persian: دهستان ناصری
- Rural District
- Location within Iran
- Coordinates: 30°36′56″N 48°30′46″E
- Country: Iran
- Province: Khuzestan
- County: Shadegan
- District: Khanafereh
- Established: 2010
- Capital: Naseri

Population (2016)
  - Total: 10,376
- Time zone: UTC+3:30 (IRST)

Naseri Rural District (Persian: دهستان ناصری) is in Khanafereh District of Shadegan County, Khuzestan province, Iran. Its capital is the village of Naseri.

== History ==
After the 2006 National Census, Khanafereh Rural District (Note: Renamed Salami Rural District) was separated from the Central District in the formation of Khanafereh District, and Naseri Rural District was created in the new district.

== Demographics ==
=== Population ===
At the time of the 2011 census, the rural district's population was 11,285 in 2,518 households. The 2016 census measured the population of the rural district as 10,376 in 2,676 households. The most populous of its 10 villages was Geydari, with 2,229 people.
