= Salami Rural District (Shadegan County) =

Rural district in Khuzestan province, Iran

Salami Rural District Persian: دهستان سالمی
- Rural District
- Location within Iran
- Coordinates: 30°30′06″N 48°31′31″E
- Country: Iran
- Province: Khuzestan
- County: Shadegan
- District: Khanafereh
- Capital: Khanafereh

Population (2016)
  - Total: 10,504
- Time zone: UTC+3:30 (IRST)

Salami Rural District (Persian: دهستان سالمی) (Note: Formerly Khanafereh Rural District (دهستان خنافره)) is in Khanafereh District of Shadegan County, Khuzestan province, Iran. It is administered from the city of Khanafereh. (Note: Formerly the village of Khorusi-ye Jonubi)

== Demographics ==
=== Population ===
At the time of the 2006 census, the rural district's population (as Khanafereh Rural District of the Central District) was 24,107 in 3,966 households. The following census in 2011 counted 11,285 in 2,518 households, by which time the rural district had been separated from the district in the formation of Khanafereh District and renamed Salami Rural District. The 2016 census measured the population of the rural district as 10,504 in 2,734 households. The most populous of its six villages was Salami, with 3,019 people.
