= Khanafereh District =

District in Khuzestan province, Iran

Khanafereh District Persian: بخش خنافره
- District
- Location within Iran
- Coordinates: 30°32′11″N 48°30′49″E
- Country: Iran
- Province: Khuzestan
- County: Shadegan
- Established: 2010
- Capital: Khanafereh

Population (2016)
  - Total: 24,733
- Time zone: UTC+3:30 (IRST)

Khanafereh District (Persian: بخش خنافره) is in Shadegan County, Khuzestan province, Iran. Its capital is the city of Khanafereh.

== History ==
After the 2006 National Census, Khanafereh Rural District (Note: Renamed Salami Rural District) was separated from the Central District in the formation of Khanafereh District. After the 2011 census, the village of Khorusi-ye Jonubi was elevated to city status as Khanafereh.

== Demographics ==
=== Population ===
At the time of the 2011 census, the district's population was 26,133 people in 5,861 households. The 2016 census measured the population of the district as 24,733 inhabitants in 6,368 households.

=== Administrative divisions ===
Khanafereh District Population
Administrative Divisions	2011	2016
Naseri RD	11,285	10,376
Salami RD (Note: Formerly Khanafereh Rural District)	14,848	10,504
Khanafereh (city)		3,853
Total	26,133	24,733
RD = Rural District
