= Hoseyni Rural District =

Rural district in Khuzestan province, Iran

Hoseyni Rural District Persian: دهستان حسيني
- Rural District
- Location within Iran
- Coordinates: 30°48′29″N 48°49′33″E
- Country: Iran
- Province: Khuzestan
- County: Shadegan
- District: Central
- Capital: Ghoreybeh

Population (2016)
  - Total: 10,949
- Time zone: UTC+3:30 (IRST)

Hoseyni Rural District (Persian: دهستان حسيني) is in the Central District of Shadegan County, Khuzestan province, Iran. Its capital is the village of Ghoreybeh.

== Demographics ==
=== Population ===
At the time of the 2006 National Census, the rural district's population was 12,691 in 2,164 households. There were 14,870 inhabitants in 3,310 households at the following census of 2011. The 2016 census measured the population of the rural district as 10,949 in 2,707 households. The most populous of its 45 villages was Mansureh-ye Olya, with 3,242 people.
