= Buzi Rural District =

Rural district in Khuzestan province, Iran

Buzi Rural District Persian: دهستان بوزی
- Rural District
- Location within Iran
- Coordinates: 30°31′40″N 48°52′46″E
- Country: Iran
- Province: Khuzestan
- County: Shadegan
- District: Central
- Capital: Buzi-ye Bala

Population (2016)
  - Total: 11,727
- Time zone: UTC+3:30 (IRST)

Buzi Rural District (Persian: دهستان بوزی) is in the Central District of Shadegan County, Khuzestan province, Iran. Its capital is the village of Buzi-ye Bala.

== Demographics ==
=== Population ===
At the time of the 2006 National Census, the rural district's population was 10,923 in 2,003 households. There were 11,785 inhabitants in 2,713 households at the following census of 2011. The 2016 census measured the population of the rural district as 11,727 in 3,011 households. The most populous of its 57 villages was Buzi-ye Seyf, with 2,247 people.
