= Jaffal Rural District =

Rural district in Khuzestan province, Iran

Jaffal Rural District Persian: دهستان جفال
- Rural District
- Location within Iran
- Coordinates: 30°46′48″N 48°36′11″E
- Country: Iran
- Province: Khuzestan
- County: Shadegan
- District: Central
- Capital: Jaffal

Population (2016)
  - Total: 20,268
- Time zone: UTC+3:30 (IRST)

Jaffal Rural District (Persian: دهستان جفال) is in the Central District of Shadegan County, Khuzestan province, Iran. Its capital is the village of Jaffal.

== Demographics ==
=== Population ===
At the time of the 2006 National Census, the rural district's population was 17,849 in 2,889 households. There were 20,667 inhabitants in 4,490 households at the following census of 2011. The 2016 census measured the population of the rural district as 20,268 in 5,312 households. The most populous of its 41 villages was Emam-e Seh, with 1,834 people.
