= Central District (Shadegan County) =

District in Khuzestan province, Iran

Central District (Shadegan County) Persian: بخش مرکزی شهرستان شادگان
- District
- Location within Iran
- Coordinates: 30°37′04″N 48°44′54″E
- Country: Iran
- Province: Khuzestan
- County: Shadegan
- Capital: Shadegan

Population (2016)
  - Total: 98,986
- Time zone: UTC+3:30 (IRST)

The Central District of Shadegan County (Persian: بخش مرکزی شهرستان شادگان) is in Khuzestan province, Iran. Its capital is the city of Shadegan.

== History ==
After the 2006 National Census, Khanafereh Rural District (Note: Transferred to Darkhoveyn District) was separated from the district in the formation of Khanafereh District. After the 2011 census, Darkhoveyn Rural District and the city of Darkhoveyn were separated from the Central District in forming Darkhoveyn District.

== Demographics ==
=== Population ===
At the time of the 2006 census, the Central District's population was 138,226 in 23,813 households. The following census in 2011 counted 127,222 people in 28,759 households. The 2016 census measured the population of the district as 98,986 inhabitants in 25,951 households.

=== Administrative divisions ===
Central District (Shadegan County) Population
Administrative Divisions	2006	2011	2016
Abshar RD	10,832	13,016	14,309
Buzi RD	10,923	11,785	11,727
Darkhoveyn RD	13,182	8,339	
Hoseyni RD	12,691	14,870	10,949
Jaffal RD	17,849	20,667	20,268
Khanafereh RD (Note: Transferred to Khanafereh District and renamed Salami Rural District)	24,107		
Darkhoveyn (city)		5,759	
Shadegan (city)	48,642	52,786	41,733
Total	138,226	127,222	98,986
RD = Rural District
