= Shadegan County =

County in Khuzestan province, Iran

Shadegan County Persian: شهرستان شادگان
- County
- Location of Shadegan County in Khuzestan province (bottom left, green)

- Location of Khuzestan province in Iran
- Coordinates: 30°39′N 48°40′E
- Country: Iran
- Province: Khuzestan
- Capital: Shadegan
- Districts: Central, Darkhoveyn, Khanafereh

Population (2016)
  - Total: 138,480
- Time zone: UTC+3:30 (IRST)

Shadegan County (Persian: شهرستان شادگان) (Note: Also romanized as Ŝahrestāne Ŝādegān) is in Khuzestan province, Iran. Its capital is the city of Shadegan.

== History ==
After the 2006 National Census, Khanafereh Rural District (Note: Renamed Salami Rural District) was separated from the Central District in the formation of Khanafereh District, including the new Naseri Rural District.

After the 2011 census, Darkhoveyn Rural District and the city of Darkhoveyn were separated from the Central District in forming Darkhoveyn District, including the new Darisiyeh Rural District. At the same time, the village of Khorusi-ye Jonubi was elevated to city status as Khanafereh.

== Demographics ==
=== Population ===
At the time of the 2006 census, the county's population was 138,226 in 23,813 households. The following census in 2011 counted 153,355 people in 34,618 households. The 2016 census measured the population of the county as 138,480 in 36,031 households.

=== Administrative divisions ===
Shadegan County's population history and administrative structure over three consecutive censuses are shown in the following table.

Shadegan County Population
| Administrative Divisions | 2006 | 2011 | 2016 |
|---|---|---|---|
| Central District | 138,226 | 127,222 | 98,986 |
| Abshar RD | 10,832 | 13,016 | 14,309 |
| Buzi RD | 10,923 | 11,785 | 11,727 |
| Darkhoveyn RD | 13,182 | 8,339 | |
| Hoseyni RD | 12,691 | 14,870 | 10,949 |
| Jaffal RD | 17,849 | 20,667 | 20,268 |
| Khanafereh RD | 24,107 | | |
| Darkhoveyn (city) | | 5,759 | |
| Shadegan (city) | 48,642 | 52,786 | 41,733 |
| Darkhoveyn District | | | 14,754 |
| Darisiyeh RD | | | 5,037 |
| Darkhoveyn RD | | | 4,062 |
| Darkhoveyn (city) | | | 5,655 |
| Khanafereh District | | 26,133 | 24,733 |
| Naseri RD | | 11,285 | 10,376 |
| Salami RD (Note: Formerly Khanafereh Rural District) | | 14,848 | 10,504 |
| Khanafereh (city) | | | 3,853 |
| Total | 138,226 | 153,355 | 138,480 |
RD = Rural District

== See also ==
Media related to Shadegan County at Wikimedia Commons
