= Veshareh, Qom =

Village in Qom province, Iran

Veshareh Persian: وشاره
- Village
- Location within Iran
- Coordinates: 34°31′02″N 50°13′49″E
- Country: Iran
- Province: Qom
- County: Qom
- District: Khalajestan
- Rural District: Dastjerd

Population (2016)
  - Total: 175
- Time zone: UTC+3:30 (IRST)

Veshareh (Persian: وشاره) (Note: Also romanized as Veshāreh; also known as Beshāreh) is a village in Dastjerd Rural District of Khalajestan District in Qom County, Qom province, Iran. Veshareh is near the city of Dastjerd and the Karkas Mountains. Its surrounding villages are: Mujan, Giv, Mansurabad, Sorkhdeh, Hemmatabad, and Jowzeh.

== History ==
Khajeh Nasir Toosi was born in Veshareh. There is a mountain in the village which is called Khaje Nasir mountain (Kooh-e Khajeh Nasir). Previously there was a castle on the mountain with the same name which has been destroyed completely. The original name of the village was Varshah which in time became Veshareh.

== Demographics ==
=== Population ===
At the time of the 2006 National Census, the village's population was 254 in 79 households. The following census in 2011 counted 224 people in 77 households. The 2016 census measured the population of the village as 175 people in 70 households.
