= Sorkheh Deh =

Sorkheh Deh (Persian: سرخه ده) may refer to:

- Sorkheh Deh, Harsin, Kermanshah Province
- Sorkheh Deh, Salas-e Babajani, Kermanshah Province
- Sorkheh Deh-e Olya, Lorestan Province
- Sorkheh Deh-e Sofla, Lorestan Province
- Sorkheh Deh, Markazi
- Sorkh Deh, Qom
- Sorkheh Deh, Tehran

== See also ==
- Deh Sorkheh (disambiguation)
- Sorkhdeh (disambiguation)
