= Deh Sorkh =

Deh Sorkh or Deh-e Sorkh (Persian: دهسرخ or ده سرخ) may refer to:

== Afghanistan ==
- Deh Sorkh, Afghanistan

== Iran ==
- Deh Sorkh, Hamadan
- Deh Sorkh, Isfahan
- Deh Sorkh, Javanrud, Kermanshah Province
- Deh Sorkh, Ravansar, Kermanshah Province
- Deh-e Sorkh, Lorestan
- Deh Sorkh, Razavi Khorasan
- Deh Sorkh, Ahmadabad, Razavi Khorasan Province

== See also ==
- Deh Sorkheh (disambiguation)
