= Kiab =

Village in Qom province, Iran

Kiab Persian: كياب
- Village
- Location within Iran
- Coordinates: 34°38′56″N 50°15′43″E
- Country: Iran
- Province: Qom
- County: Jafarabad
- District: Qahan
- Rural District: Kohandan

Population (2016)
  - Total: 28
- Time zone: UTC+3:30 (IRST)

Kiab (Persian: كياب) (Note: Also romanized as Kīāb and Kīyāb; also known as Kīeh Āb) is a village in Kohandan Rural District of Qahan District in Jafarabad County, Qom province, Iran.

== Demographics ==
=== Population ===
At the time of the 2006 National Census, the village's population was 26 in 11 households, when it was in Qahan Rural District of Khalajestan District in Qom County. The following census in 2011 counted 15 people in seven households. The 2016 census measured the population of the village as 28 people in 13 households.

In 2021, the rural district was separated from the county in the establishment of Jafarabad County and transferred to the new Qahan District. Kiab was transferred to Kohandan Rural District created in the same district.
