= Alkan =

Alkan may refer to:

== People ==
- Alkan (name), list of people with the name
  - Particularly Charles-Valentin Alkan (1813–1888), French composer

== Places ==
=== Iran ===
- Alkan, Kohgiluyeh and Boyer-Ahmad
- Alkan, Qom

=== Turkey ===
- Alkan, Gülşehir, in Gülşehir district

== Other uses ==
- Alkan Air, airline servicing northwestern Canada and Alaska

== See also ==
- Alcan, Canadian mining company
- Alken (disambiguation)
- Alkin
- Alceni (disambiguation)
