= Kohandan =

Village in Qom province, Iran

Kohandan Persian: كهندان
- Village
- Location within Iran
- Coordinates: 34°40′06″N 50°10′01″E
- Country: Iran
- Province: Qom
- County: Jafarabad
- District: Qahan
- Rural District: Kohandan

Population (2016)
  - Total: 213
- Time zone: UTC+3:30 (IRST)

Kohandan (Persian: كهندان) (Note: Also romanized as Kohandān) is a village in, and the capital of, Kohandan Rural District in Qahan District of Jafarabad County, Qom province, Iran.

== Demographics ==
=== Population ===
At the time of the 2006 National Census, the village's population was 429 in 138 households, when it was in Qahan Rural District of Khalajestan District in Qom County. The following census in 2011 counted 201 people in 71 households. The 2016 census measured the population of the village as 213 people in 97 households.

In 2021, the rural district was separated from the county in the establishment of Jafarabad County and transferred to the new Qahan District. Kohandan was transferred to Kohandan Rural District created in the same district.
