= Alikhan Beyki =

Village in Qom province, Iran

Alikhan Beyki Persian: علي خان بيكي
- Village
- Location within Iran
- Coordinates: 34°42′41″N 50°22′30″E
- Country: Iran
- Province: Qom
- County: Jafarabad
- District: Qahan
- Rural District: Kohandan

Population (2016)
  - Total: 14
- Time zone: UTC+3:30 (IRST)

Alikhan Beyki (Persian: علي خان بيكي) (Note: Also romanized as ‘Alīkhān Beykī; also known as ‘Alījān Beygī and ‘Alīkhān Beygī) is a village in Kohandan Rural District of Qahan District in Jafarabad County, Qom province, Iran.

== Demographics ==
=== Population ===
At the time of the 2006 National Census, the village's population was 24 in five households, when it was in Qahan Rural District of Khalajestan District in Qom County. The following census in 2011 counted a population below the reporting threshold. The 2016 census measured the population of the village as 14 people in four households.

In 2021, the rural district was separated from the county in the establishment of Jafarabad County and transferred to the new Qahan District. Alikhan Beyki was transferred to Kohandan Rural District created in the same district.
