= Venan =

Village in Qom province, Iran

Venan Persian: ونان
- Village
- Location within Iran
- Coordinates: 34°40′58″N 50°11′19″E
- Country: Iran
- Province: Qom
- County: Jafarabad
- District: Qahan
- Rural District: Kohandan

Population (2016)
  - Total: 50
- Time zone: UTC+3:30 (IRST)

Venan (Persian: ونان) (Note: Also romanized as Vanān and Venān) is a village in Kohandan Rural District of Qahan District in Jafarabad County, Qom province, Iran.

== Demographics ==
=== Population ===
At the time of the 2006 National Census, the village's population was 192 in 66 households, when it was in Qahan Rural District of Khalajestan District in Qom County. The following census in 2011 counted 80 people in 34 households. The 2016 census measured the population of the village as 50 people in 23 households.

In 2021, the rural district was separated from the county in the establishment of Jafarabad County and transferred to the new Qahan District. Venan was transferred to Kohandan Rural District created in the same district.
