= Mushakiyeh =

Village in Qom province, Iran

Mushakiyeh Persian: موشكيه
- Village
- Location within Iran
- Coordinates: 34°41′59″N 50°18′34″E
- Country: Iran
- Province: Qom
- County: Jafarabad
- District: Qahan
- Rural District: Kohandan

Population (2016)
  - Total: 15
- Time zone: UTC+3:30 (IRST)

Mushakiyeh (Persian: موشكيه) (Note: Also romanized as Mūshakīyeh and Mūshkīyeh; also known as Mūsākheh) is a village in Kohandan Rural District of Qahan District in Jafarabad County, Qom province, Iran.

== Demographics ==
=== Population ===
At the time of the 2006 National Census, the village's population was 46 in 19 households, when it was in Qahan Rural District of Khalajestan District in Qom County. The following census in 2011 counted 12 people in six households. The 2016 census measured the population of the village as 15 people in seven households.

In 2021, the rural district was separated from the county in the establishment of Jafarabad County and transferred to the new Qahan District. Mushakiyeh was transferred to Kohandan Rural District created in the same district.
