= Vasfownjerd =

Village in Qom province, Iran

Vasfownjerd Persian: وسفونجرد
- Village
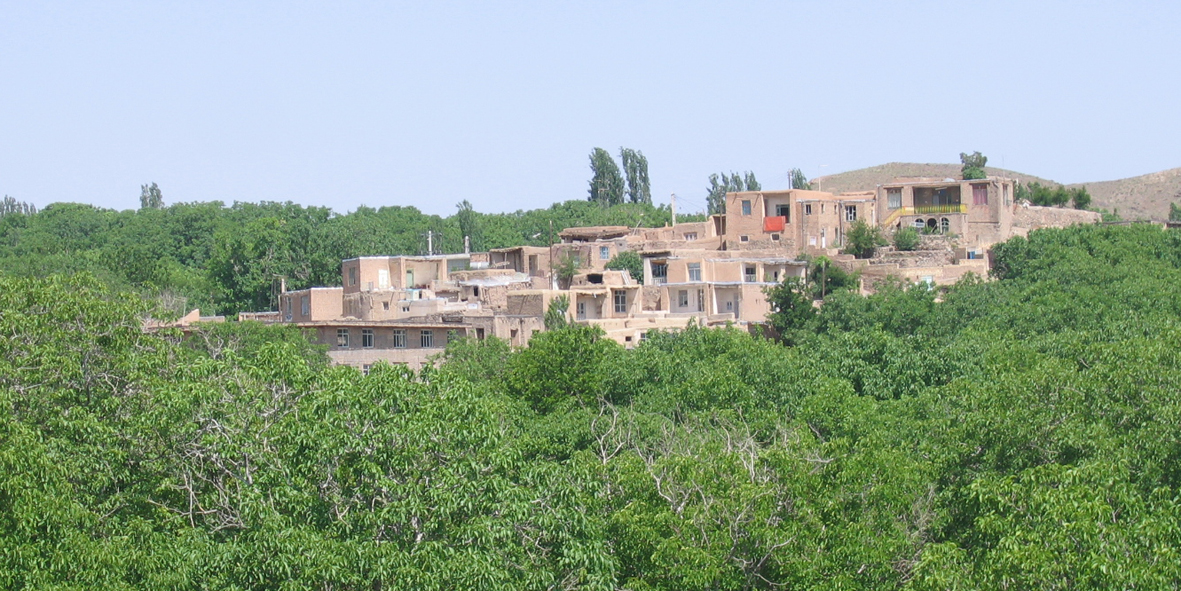
- The village of Vasfownjerd

- Location within Iran
- Coordinates: 34°40′23″N 50°17′13″E
- Country: Iran
- Province: Qom
- County: Jafarabad
- District: Qahan
- Rural District: Kohandan

Population (2016)
  - Total: 103
- Time zone: UTC+3:30 (IRST)

Vasfownjerd (Persian: وسفونجرد) is a village in Kohandan Rural District of Qahan District in Jafarabad County, Qom province, Iran.

== Demographics ==
=== Population ===
At the time of the 2006 National Census, the village's population was 224 in 79 households, when it was in Qahan Rural District of Khalajestan District in Qom County. The following census in 2011 counted 140 people in 60 households. The 2016 census measured the population of the village as 103 people in 52 households.

In 2021, the rural district was separated from the county in the establishment of Jafarabad County and transferred to the new Qahan District. Vasfownjerd was transferred to Kohandan Rural District created in the same district.
