= Chamanak =

Village in Qom province, Iran

Chamanak Persian: چمانك
- Village
- Location within Iran
- Coordinates: 34°39′51″N 50°13′49″E
- Country: Iran
- Province: Qom
- County: Jafarabad
- District: Qahan
- Rural District: Kohandan

Population (2016)
  - Total: 61
- Time zone: UTC+3:30 (IRST)

Chamanak (Persian: چمانك) (Note: Also romanized as Chamānak) is a village in Kohandan Rural District of Qahan District in Jafarabad County, Qom province, Iran.

== Demographics ==
=== Population ===
At the time of the 2006 National Census, the village's population was 59 in 25 households, when it was in Qahan Rural District of Khalajestan District in Qom County. The following census in 2011 counted 24 people in nine households. The 2016 census measured the population of the village as 61 people in 22 households.

In 2021, the rural district was separated from the county in the establishment of Jafarabad County and transferred to the new Qahan District. Chamanak was transferred to Kohandan Rural District created in the same district.
