= Rushagan =

Village in Qom province, Iran

Rushagan Persian: روشگان
- Village
- Location within Iran
- Coordinates: 34°38′12″N 50°13′48″E
- Country: Iran
- Province: Qom
- County: Jafarabad
- District: Qahan
- Rural District: Kohandan

Population (2016)
  - Total: 35
- Time zone: UTC+3:30 (IRST)

Rushagan (Persian: روشگان) (Note: Also romanized as Rūshagān; also known as Rūshakān) is a village in Kohandan Rural District of Qahan District in Jafarabad County, Qom province, Iran.

== Demographics ==
=== Population ===
At the time of the 2006 National Census, the village's population was 45 in 14 households, when it was in Qahan Rural District of Khalajestan District in Qom County. The following census in 2011 counted 50 people in 15 households. The 2016 census measured the population of the village as 35 people in 22 households.

In 2021, the rural district was separated from the county in the establishment of Jafarabad County and transferred to the new Qahan District. Rushagan was transferred to Kohandan Rural District created in the same district.
