= Deh Sorkheh =

Deh Sorkheh (Persian: ده سرخه) may refer to:

- Deh Sorkheh, Hamadan
- Deh Sorkheh, Borujerd, Lorestan Province
- Deh Sorkheh, Selseleh, Lorestan Province

== See also ==
- Deh Sorkh (disambiguation)
- Sorkheh Deh (disambiguation)
