= Pierre Jannet (bibliographer) =

French bibliographer

Pierre Jannet (5 January 1820, Saint-Germain-de-Grave – November 1870, Paris) was a 19th-century French bibliophile and bibliographer.

A self-educated publisher, Jannet published with the assistance of Ternaux-Compans, the Bibliothèque elzévirienne, elegant collection of 16th-century French writers, of which he edited himself several volumes: l’Ancien Théâtre Français, les Facétieuses de Straparole, etc.

He wrote several collections of bibliographies.

== Sources ==
- Gustave Vapereau, Dictionnaire universel des littératures, Paris, Hachette, 1876, p. 1090
- Alphonse Alkan, Les étiquettes et les inscriptions des boîtes-volumes de Pierre Jannet, Fondateur de la Bibliothèque elzéverienne, 1883
