= Alkon (disambiguation) =

Alkon is a Russian alcoholic beverage manufacturer.

Alkon may also refer to:

- Amy Alkon (born 1964), American advice columnist and author
- David Alkon (born 1937), Mexican former sports shooter

== See also ==
- Alcon (disambiguation)
- Alkan (disambiguation)
- Alken (disambiguation)
- Alkin
