= Anjileh =

Anjileh (Persian: انجيله) may refer to:

- Anjileh, Kurdistan
- Anjileh, Qom
