= Gazabad, Qom =

Village in Qom province, Iran

Gazabad Persian: گزاباد
- Village
- Location within Iran
- Coordinates: 34°45′40″N 50°14′49″E
- Country: Iran
- Province: Qom
- County: Jafarabad
- District: Qahan
- Rural District: Qahan

Population (2016)
  - Total: Below reporting threshold
- Time zone: UTC+3:30 (IRST)

Gazabad (Persian: گزاباد) (Note: Also romanized as Gazābād; also known as Gazābād-e Soflá) is a village in Qahan Rural District of Qahan District in Jafarabad County, Qom province, Iran.

== Demographics ==
=== Population ===
At the time of the 2006 National Census, the village's population was 22 in six households, when it was in Khalajestan District of Qom County. The following censuses in 2011 and 2016 counted a population below the reporting threshold.

In 2021, the rural district was separated from the county in the establishment of Jafarabad County and transferred to the new Qahan District.
