= Jemezqan =

Village in Qom province, Iran

Jemezqan Persian: جمزقان
- Village
- Location within Iran
- Coordinates: 34°43′40″N 50°16′41″E
- Country: Iran
- Province: Qom
- County: Jafarabad
- District: Qahan
- Rural District: Qahan

Population (2016)
  - Total: 8
- Time zone: UTC+3:30 (IRST)

Jemezqan (Persian: جمزقان) (Note: Also romanized as Jemezqān) is a village in Qahan Rural District of Qahan District in Jafarabad County, Qom province, Iran.

== Demographics ==
=== Population ===
At the time of the 2006 National Census, the village's population was 37 in eight households, when it was in Khalajestan District of Qom County. The following census in 2011 counted 30 people in 13 households. The 2016 census measured the population of the village as eight people in five households.

In 2021, the rural district was separated from the county in the establishment of Jafarabad County and transferred to the new Qahan District.
