= Kasva =

Village in Qom province, Iran

Kasva Persian: كاسوا
- Village
- Location within Iran
- Coordinates: 34°43′32″N 50°10′49″E
- Country: Iran
- Province: Qom
- County: Jafarabad
- District: Qahan
- Rural District: Qahan
- Elevation: 1,880 m (6,170 ft)

Population (2016)
  - Total: 111
- Time zone: UTC+3:30 (IRST)

Kasva (Persian: كاسوا) (Note: Also romanized as Kāsvā) is a village in Qahan Rural District of Qahan District in Jafarabad County, Qom province, Iran.

The 14th-century author Hamdallah Mustawfi listed Kasva as one of the main villages in the district of Aveh.

== Demographics ==
=== Population ===
At the time of the 2006 National Census, the village's population was 143 in 62 households, when it was in Khalajestan District of Qom County. The following census in 2011 counted 137 people in 66 households. The 2016 census measured the population of the village as 111 people in 46 households.

In 2021, the rural district was separated from the county in the establishment of Jafarabad County and transferred to the new Qahan District.
