= Algan, Qom =

Village in Qom province, Iran

Algan Persian: الگان
- Village
- Location within Iran
- Coordinates: 34°40′25″N 50°13′10″E
- Country: Iran
- Province: Qom
- County: Jafarabad
- District: Qahan
- Rural District: Kohandan

Population (2016)
  - Total: 12
- Time zone: UTC+3:30 (IRST)

Algan (Persian: الگان) (Note: Also romanized as Algān; also known as Alkān) is a village in Kohandan Rural District of Qahan District in Jafarabad County, Qom province, Iran.

== Demographics ==
=== Population ===
At the time of the 2006 National Census, the village's population was 50 in 21 households, when it was in Qahan Rural District of Khalajestan District in Qom County. The following census in 2011 counted 130 people in 54 households. The 2016 census measured the population of the village as 12 people in four households.

In 2021, the rural district was separated from the county in the establishment of Jafarabad County and transferred to the new Qahan District. Algan was transferred to Kohandan Rural District created in the same district.
