= Mehrzamin =

Village in Qom province, Iran

Mehrzamin Persian: مهرزمين
- Village
- Location within Iran
- Coordinates: 34°47′24″N 50°09′56″E
- Country: Iran
- Province: Qom
- County: Jafarabad
- District: Qahan
- Rural District: Qahan

Population (2016)
  - Total: 314
- Time zone: UTC+3:30 (IRST)

Mehrzamin (Persian: مهرزمين) (Note: Also romanized as Mehrzamīn) is a village in Qahan Rural District of Qahan District in Jafarabad County, Qom province, Iran.

== Demographics ==
=== Population ===
At the time of the 2006 National Census, the village's population was 479 in 127 households, when it was in Khalajestan District of Qom County. The following census in 2011 counted 308 people in 110 households. The 2016 census measured the population of the village as 314 people in 125 households.

In 2021, the rural district was separated from the county in the establishment of Jafarabad County and transferred to the new Qahan District.
