= Nevis, Iran =

Village in Qom province, Iran

Nevis Persian: نويس
- Village
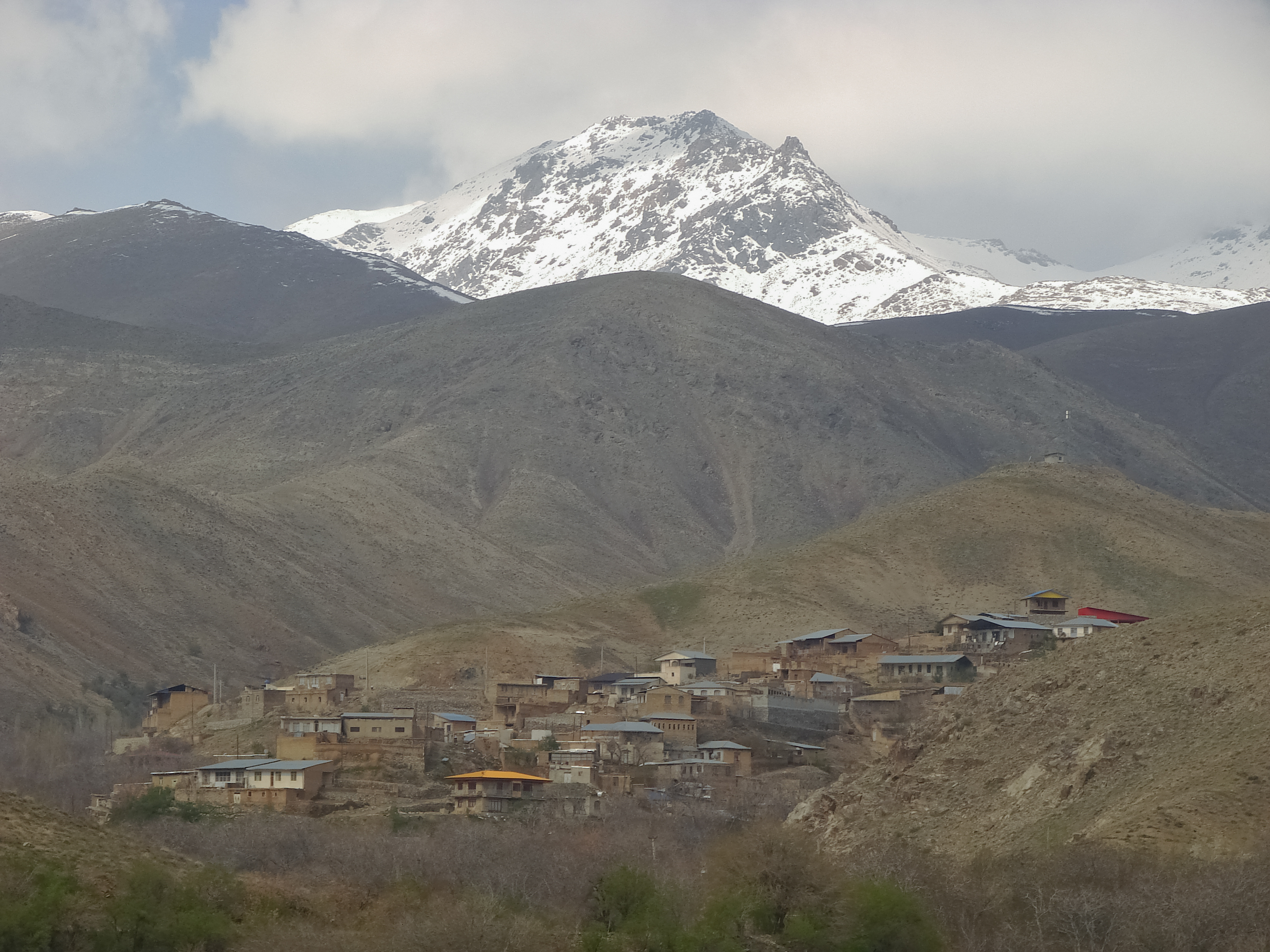
- The village of Nevis

- Location within Iran
- Coordinates: 34°43′40″N 50°11′53″E
- Country: Iran
- Province: Qom
- County: Jafarabad
- District: Qahan
- Rural District: Qahan

Population (2016)
  - Total: 158
- Time zone: UTC+3:30 (IRST)

Nevis (Persian: نويس) (Note: Also romanized as Navīs and Nevīs; also known as Nauvīsh) is a village in Qahan Rural District of Qahan District in Jafarabad County, Qom province, Iran.

== Demographics ==
=== Population ===
At the time of the 2006 National Census, the village's population was 384 in 140 households, when it was in Khalajestan District of Qom County. The following census in 2011 counted 201 people in 106 households. The 2016 census measured the population of the village as 158 people in 74 households.

In 2021, the rural district was separated from the county in the establishment of Jafarabad County and transferred to the new Qahan District.
