= Alcan (disambiguation) =

Alcan was a Canadian mining company and aluminum manufacturer.

Alcan may also refer to:

- Alcan Highway, or Alaska Highway, a highway linking Alaska and Canada
- Alcan–Beaver Creek Border Crossing, a border crossing on the Alaska Highway
- Eugène Alcan (1811-c. 1898), a French writer
- Rio Tinto Alcan, the present incarnation of the Alcan company

== See also ==
- Alcon (disambiguation)
