= Esfid, Qom =

Village in Qom province, Iran

Esfid Persian: اسفيد
- Village
- Location within Iran
- Coordinates: 34°41′43″N 50°21′05″E
- Country: Iran
- Province: Qom
- County: Jafarabad
- District: Qahan
- Rural District: Kohandan

Population (2016)
  - Total: 225
- Time zone: UTC+3:30 (IRST)

Esfid (Persian: اسفيد) (Note: Also romanized as Esfīd; also known as Ispi) is a village in Kohandan Rural District of Qahan District in Jafarabad County, Qom province, Iran.

== Demographics ==
=== Population ===
At the time of the 2006 National Census, the village's population was 289 in 79 households, when it was in Qahan Rural District of Khalajestan District in Qom County. The following census in 2011 counted 241 people in 71 households. The 2016 census measured the population of the village as 225 people in 73 households.

In 2021, the rural district was separated from the county in the establishment of Jafarabad County and transferred to the new Qahan District. Esfid was transferred to Kohandan Rural District created in the same district.
