= Chahak, Qom =

Village in Qom province, Iran

Chahak Persian: چاهك
- Village
- Location within Iran
- Coordinates: 34°45′59″N 50°18′23″E
- Country: Iran
- Province: Qom
- County: Jafarabad
- District: Qahan
- Rural District: Qahan

Population (2016)
  - Total: 280
- Time zone: UTC+3:30 (IRST)

Chahak (Persian: چاهك) (Note: Also romanized as Chāhak) is a village in Qahan Rural District of Qahan District in Jafarabad County, Qom province, Iran.

== Demographics ==
=== Population ===
At the time of the 2006 National Census, the village's population was 395 in 130 households, when it was in Khalajestan District of Qom County. The following census in 2011 counted 297 people in 103 households. The 2016 census measured the population of the village as 280 people in 99 households.

In 2021, the rural district was separated from the county in the establishment of Jafarabad County and transferred to the new Qahan District.
