= Sorkh Deh =

Sorkh Deh or Sorkhdeh or Surkhdeh (Persian: سرخده) may refer to:

- Sorkh Deh, Kermanshah
- Sorkh Deh, Qom
- Surkhdeh, Tehran
- Sorkh Deh, Semnan

== See also ==
- Sorkheh Deh (disambiguation)
