= Banabar, Qahan =

Village in Qom province, Iran

Banabar Persian: بنابر
- Village
- Location within Iran
- Coordinates: 34°43′37″N 50°16′55″E
- Country: Iran
- Province: Qom
- County: Jafarabad
- District: Qahan
- Rural District: Qahan

Population (2016)
  - Total: 160
- Time zone: UTC+3:30 (IRST)

Banabar (Persian: بنابر) (Note: Also romanized as Banābar) is a village in Qahan Rural District of Qahan District in Jafarabad County, Qom province, Iran.

== Demographics ==
=== Population ===
At the time of the 2006 National Census, the village's population was 212 in 67 households, when it was in Khalajestan District of Qom County. The following census in 2011 counted 179 people in 57 households. The 2016 census measured the population of the village as 160 people in 53 households.

In 2021, the rural district was separated from the county in the establishment of Jafarabad County and transferred to the new Qahan District.
