= Aghelak =

Village in Qom province, Iran

Aghelak Persian: اغلك
- Village
- Location within Iran
- Coordinates: 34°44′03″N 50°19′27″E
- Country: Iran
- Province: Qom
- County: Jafarabad
- District: Qahan
- Rural District: Qahan

Population (2016)
  - Total: 49
- Time zone: UTC+3:30 (IRST)

Aghelak (Persian: اغلك) (Note: Also romanized as Āghlak and Āgholak; also known as Āqā Lak and Āqlak) is a village in Qahan Rural District of Qahan District in Jafarabad County, Qom province, Iran.

== Demographics ==
=== Population ===
At the time of the 2006 National Census, the village's population was 114 in 36 households, when it was in Khalajestan District of Qom County. The following census in 2011 counted 44 people in 16 households. The 2016 census measured the population of the village as 49 people in 14 households.

In 2021, the rural district was separated from the county in the establishment of Jafarabad County and transferred to the new Qahan District.
