= Sulaqan =

Sulaqan and Suleqan and Sulqan (Persian: سولقان) may refer to:

- Suleqan, Hormozgan
- Sulaqan, Qom
- Sulqan Rural District, in Tehran Province
