= Mansurabad, Qom =

Mansurabad منصوراباد
- Village
- Location within Iran
- Coordinates: 34°31′50″N 50°15′03″E
- Country: Iran
- Province: Qom
- County: Qom
- Bakhsh: Khalajestan
- Rural District: Dastjerd

Population (2006)
  - Total: 195
- Time zone: UTC+3:30 (IRST)
  - Summer (DST): UTC+4:30 (IRDT)

Mansurabad (Persian: منصوراباد, also Romanized as Manşūrābād) is a village in Dastjerd Rural District, Khalajestan District, Qom County, Qom Province, Iran. At the 2006 census, its population was 195, in 63 families.
