= Sorkheh Dar =

Sorkheh Dar (Persian: سرخه در may refer to:

- Sorkheh Darreh, Alborz, Iran
- Sorkheh Deh-e Olya, Lorestan, Iran
