= Ispi =

Ispi may refer to:

- The Iranian city Esfid, also known as Ispi
- The Institute for International Political Studies, an Italian think tank
