= Sugan =

Sugan may refer to:

- Súgán, an Irish word for straw rope
- Sugan, alternate name of Sulaqan, Qom, a village in Iran
- Sugan (album), an album by Phil Woods with Red Garland recorded in 1957
