= Alcon (disambiguation) =

Alcon is a global ophthalmic company with an emphasis on surgical and vision care products.

Alcon or ALCON may also refer to:

- Alcon (arcade game) or Slap Fight
- Alcon (computer virus)
- Alcon Entertainment, a film and TV production company
- Alcón, a surname
- Phengaris alcon, a butterfly of the family Lycaenidae
  - Phengaris alcon arenaria, a subspecies of the above
- Conservative Alliance (Nicaragua) or ALCON, a political party in Nicaragua
- ALCON, a U.S. government and military acronym

== People with the given name ==
- Alcon Bowman (1862–1938), Australian cricketer
- Alcon Copisarow (1920–2017), British civil servant
- List of people named Alcon from classical history
- List of people named Alcon from classical myth

== See also ==
- Alcones, a village in Marchihue, Cardenal Caro Province, Chile
- Alkon (disambiguation)
