= Aliabad-e Nazarali Khan =

Village in Qom province, Iran

Aliabad-e Nazarali Khan Persian: علي اباد نظرعلي خان
- Village
- Location within Iran
- Coordinates: 34°43′12″N 50°23′06″E
- Country: Iran
- Province: Qom
- County: Jafarabad
- District: Qahan
- Rural District: Kohandan

Population (2016)
  - Total: 144
- Time zone: UTC+3:30 (IRST)

Aliabad-e Nazarali Khan (Persian: علي اباد نظرعلي خان) (Note: Also romanized as ‘Alīābād-e Naz̧ar‘alī Khān; also known as ‘Alīābād-e Naz̧arkhānī) is a village in Kohandan Rural District of Qahan District in Jafarabad County, Qom province, Iran.

== Demographics ==
=== Population ===
At the time of the 2006 National Census, the village's population was 155 in 33 households, when it was in Jafarabad Rural District of Jafarabad District (Note: Renamed the Central District of Jafarabad County) in Qom County. The following census in 2011 counted 112 people in 27 households. The 2016 census measured the population of the village as 144 people in 34 households.

In 2021, the district was separated from the county in the establishment of Jafarabad County and renamed the Central District. Aliabad-e Nazarali Khan was transferred to Kohandan Rural District created in the new Qahan District.
