= Zizgan =

Village in Qom province, Iran

Zizgan Persian: زيزگان
- Village
- Location within Iran
- Coordinates: 34°31′16″N 50°10′42″E
- Country: Iran
- Province: Qom
- County: Qom
- District: Khalajestan
- Rural District: Dastjerd

Population (2016)
  - Total: 359
- Time zone: UTC+3:30 (IRST)

Zizgan (Persian: زيزگان) (Note: Also romanized as Zīzgān) is a village in Dastjerd Rural District of Khalajestan District in Qom County, Qom province, Iran.

== Demographics ==
=== Population ===
At the time of the 2006 National Census, the village's population was 377 in 111 households. The following census in 2011 counted 289 people in 95 households. The 2016 census measured the population of the village as 359 people in 123 households.
