= Alkin =

Alkin is a surname. Notable people with the surname include:

- Elizabeth Alkin (c.1600–c.1655), English publisher, nurse, and spy
- John Alkin (born 1947), English actor
- Lee Everett Alkin (1937–2022), English psychic
- Marvin C. Alkin (born 1934), American academic

== See also ==
- Alkan (disambiguation)
- Alken (disambiguation)
- Alkon (disambiguation)
