= Fujerd, Qom =

Village in Qom province, Iran

Fujerd Persian: فوجرد
- Village
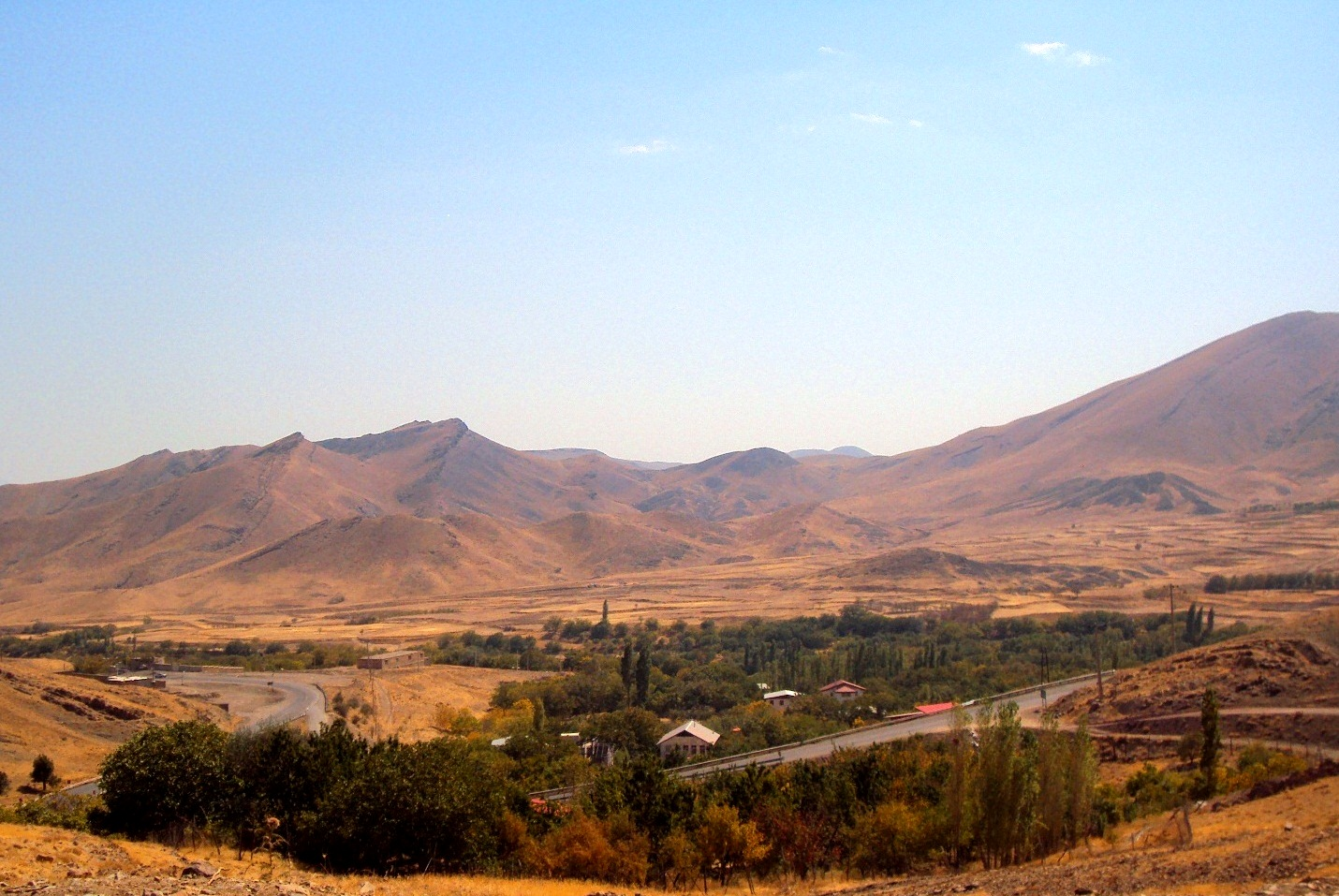
- The village of Fujerd

- Location within Iran
- Coordinates: 34°34′07″N 50°08′20″E
- Country: Iran
- Province: Qom
- County: Qom
- District: Khalajestan
- Rural District: Dastjerd

Population (2016)
  - Total: 138
- Time zone: UTC+3:30 (IRST)

Fujerd (Persian: فوجرد) (Note: Also romanized as Fūjerd, Fojird, and Fowjerd) is a village in Dastjerd Rural District of Khalajestan District in Qom County, Qom province, Iran.

== Demographics ==
=== Population ===
At the time of the 2006 National Census, the village's population was 291 in 114 households. The following census in 2011 counted 247 people in 122 households. The 2016 census measured the population of the village as 138 people in 67 households.
