= Varzaneh, Qom =

Village in Qom province, Iran

Varzaneh Persian: ورزنه
- Village
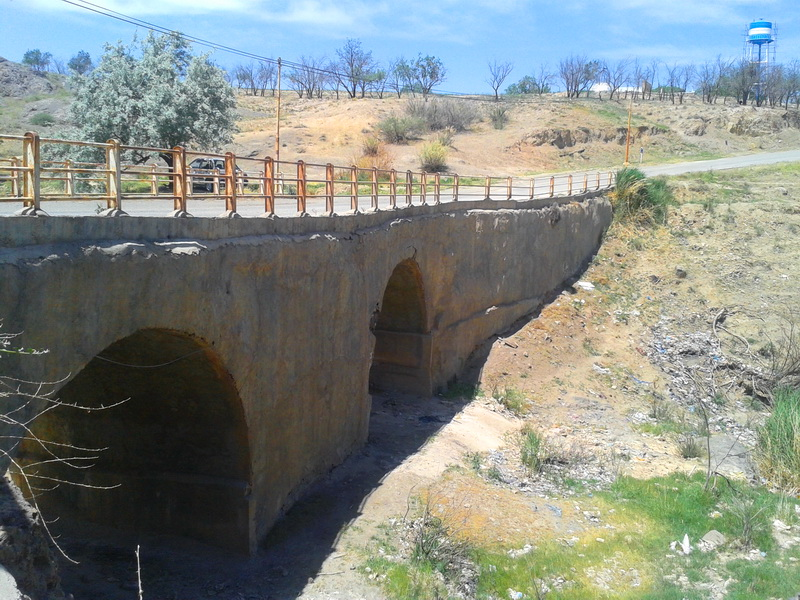
- Bridge in the village of Varzaneh

- Location within Iran
- Coordinates: 34°33′55″N 50°18′55″E
- Country: Iran
- Province: Qom
- County: Qom
- District: Khalajestan
- Rural District: Dastjerd

Population (2016)
  - Total: 125
- Time zone: UTC+3:30 (IRST)

Varzaneh (Persian: ورزنه) is a village in Dastjerd Rural District of Khalajestan District in Qom County, Qom province, Iran.

== Demographics ==
=== Population ===
At the time of the 2006 National Census, the village's population was 158 in 46 households. The following census in 2011 counted 107 people in 35 households. The 2016 census measured the population of the village as 125 people in 44 households.

== Citadel of Ghurtan ==
The ancient Ghurtan old citadel is located 12 km west of Varzaneh, and you can reach it directly from Isfahan, being 90 km east of Isfahan city. It's located on the bank of the Zayanderud river and has survived natural disasters and many wars for 1,000 years. Having very thick walls made of adobe mud brick made it a protected complex for people living in the region.

The thickness of the walls varies from 3 to 4m and they are about 9m high. The citadel has an area of 40,000 square meters. Nowadays, only four families are living inside. The citadel contains four mosques, a pigeon house, a water reservoir, a mill and many houses. It is protected by fourteen round towers, and you would enter by two gateways.
