= Kohandan Rural District =

Rural district in Qom province, Iran

Kohandan Rural District Persian: دهستان کهندان
- Rural District
- Location within Iran
- Coordinates: 34°41′N 50°15′E
- Country: Iran
- Province: Qom
- County: Jafarabad
- District: Qahan
- Established: 2021
- Capital: Kohandan
- Time zone: UTC+3:30 (IRST)

Kohandan Rural District (Persian: دهستان کهندان) is in Qahan District of Jafarabad County, Qom province, Iran. Its capital is the village of Kohandan, whose population at the time of the 2016 National Census was 213 in 97 households.

== History ==
In 2021, Jafarabad District (Note: Renamed the Central District of Jafarabad County) and Qahan Rural District were separated from Qom County in the establishment of Jafarabad County, and Kohandan Rural District was created in the new Qahan District.

== Other villages in the rural district ==
- Algan
- Aliabad-e Nazarali Khan
- Alikhan Beyki
- Chamanak
- Esfid
- Kiab
- Mushakiyeh
- Rushagan
- Vasfownjerd
- Venan
