= Nayeh =

Village in Qom province, Iran

Nayeh Persian: نايه
- Village
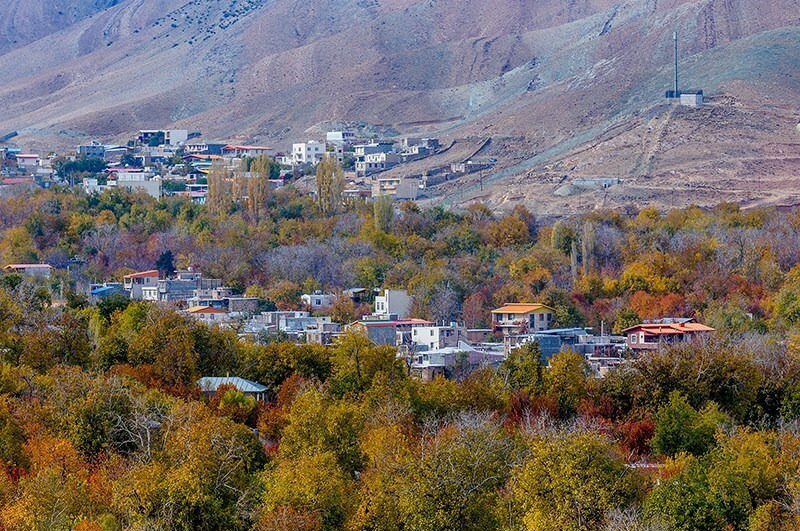
- The village of Nayeh in 2022

- Location within Iran
- Coordinates: 34°36′49″N 50°15′23″E
- Country: Iran
- Province: Qom
- County: Qom
- District: Khalajestan
- Rural District: Dastjerd

Population (2016)
  - Total: 394
- Time zone: UTC+3:30 (IRST)

Nayeh (Persian: نايه) (Note: Also romanized as Nāyeh; also known as Nāḩīyeh) is a village in Dastjerd Rural District of Khalajestan District in Qom County, Qom province, Iran.

== Demographics ==
=== Population ===
At the time of the 2006 National Census, the village's population was 499 in 166 households. The following census in 2011 counted 444 people in 156 households. The 2016 census measured the population of the village as 394 people in 161 households, the most populous in its rural district.
