= Anjileh, Qom =

Village in Qom province, Iran

Anjileh Persian: انجيله
- Village
- Location within Iran
- Coordinates: 34°43′54″N 50°09′22″E
- Country: Iran
- Province: Qom
- County: Jafarabad
- District: Qahan
- Rural District: Qahan

Population (2016)
  - Total: 232
- Time zone: UTC+3:30 (IRST)

Anjileh (Persian: انجيله) (Note: Also romanized as Anjīleh) is a village in Qahan Rural District of Qahan District in Jafarabad County, Qom province, Iran.

== Demographics ==
=== Population ===
At the time of the 2006 National Census, the village's population was 272 in 97 households, when it was in Khalajestan District of Qom County. The following census in 2011 counted 219 people in 78 households. The 2016 census measured the population of the village as 232 people in 91 households.

In 2021, the rural district was separated from the county in the establishment of Jafarabad County and transferred to the new Qahan District.
