= Qahan =

City in Qom province, Iran

Qahan Persian: قاهان
- City
- Location within Iran
- Coordinates: 34°43′30″N 50°15′46″E
- Country: Iran
- Province: Qom
- County: Jafarabad
- District: Qahan
- Established as a city: 2017

Population (2016)
  - Total: 784
- Time zone: UTC+3:30 (IRST)

Qahan (Persian: قاهان) (Note: Also romanized as Qāhān) is a city in, and the capital of, Qahan District in Jafarabad County, Qom province, Iran. It also serves as the administrative center for Qahan Rural District.

== Demographics ==
=== Population ===
At the time of the 2006 National Census, Qahan's population was 715 in 193 households, when it was a village in Qahan Rural District of Khalajestan District in Qom County. The following census in 2011 counted 747 people in 255 households. The 2016 census measured the population of the village as 784 people in 286 households, the most populous in its rural district.

In 2021, the rural district was separated from the county in the establishment of Jafarabad County and transferred to the new Qahan District. Qahan was converted to a city in 2017.
