= Giv, Qom =

Village in Qom province, Iran

Giv Persian: گيو
- Village
- Location within Iran
- Coordinates: 34°32′45″N 50°16′10″E
- Country: Iran
- Province: Qom
- County: Qom
- District: Khalajestan
- Rural District: Dastjerd

Population (2016)
  - Total: 247
- Time zone: UTC+3:30 (IRST)

Giv (Persian: گيو) (Note: Also romanized as Gīv; also known as Gīr) is a village in Dastjerd Rural District of Khalajestan District in Qom County, Qom province, Iran.

== Demographics ==
=== Population ===
At the time of the 2006 National Census, the village's population was 572 in 165 households. The following census in 2011 counted 531 people in 180 households. The 2016 census measured the population of the village as 247 people in 110 households.
