= Sulaqan, Qom =

Village in Qom province, Iran

Sulaqan Persian: سولقان
- Village
- Location within Iran
- Coordinates: 34°43′43″N 50°22′12″E
- Country: Iran
- Province: Qom
- County: Jafarabad
- District: Qahan
- Rural District: Qahan

Population (2016)
  - Total: 21
- Time zone: UTC+3:30 (IRST)

Sulaqan (Persian: سولقان) (Note: Also romanized as Sūlaqān and Sūleqān; also known as Sūgān and Sulughan) is a village in Qahan Rural District of Qahan District in Jafarabad County, Qom province, Iran.

== Demographics ==
=== Population ===
At the time of the 2006 National Census, the village's population was 81 in 18 households, when it was in Khalajestan District of Qom County. The following census in 2011 counted 56 people in 15 households. The 2016 census measured the population of the village as 21 people in eight households.

In 2021, the rural district was separated from the county in the establishment of Jafarabad County and transferred to the new Qahan District.
