= Alkan (name) =

Alkan is a surname and a masculine given name among the Turkish people. In Turkish, it means "red blood" and also refers to a commander of the Seljuk fleet based in İznik.

Notable people with the name include:

== Surname ==
- Ahmet Alkan, Turkish economist
- Akın Alkan (born 1989), Turkish football player
- Alphonse Alkan (1809–1889), French printer, bibliographer, and author
- Banu Alkan (born 1958), Turkish-Croatian actress
- Céleste Alkan (1812–1897), French musician
- Charles-Valentin Alkan (1813–1888), French composer known for his virtuosity as a pianist
- Ender Alkan (born 1977), Turkish football player
- Engin Alkan (born 1965), Turkish actor
- Erden Alkan (born 1941), Turkish actor
- Erol Alkan (born 1974), British DJ
- Erol Erdal Alkan (born 1994), Turkish football player
- Gökhan Alkan (born 1987), Turkish actor
- Hüseyin Alkan (born 1988), Turkish Paralympian goalball player
- İlayda Alkan (born 1998), Turkish female volleyball player
- Napoléon Alkan (1826–1906), French composer
- Okan Alkan (born 1992), Turkish football player
- Siegfried Alkan (1858–1941), German composer
- Yakup Alkan (born 1992), Turkish football player
- Yüksel Alkan (1931–2017), Turkish basketball player

== Given name ==
- Alkan Chaglar (born 1981), Turkish Cypriot journalist and columnist
- Alkan Tololo (died 2003), Papua New Guinean diplomat
