= Alken =

Alken may refer to:

== People ==
- Henry Thomas Alken (1785–1851), English painter and engraver
- Samuel Alken (1756–1815), English engraver

== Places ==
- Alken, Belgium
- Alken, Denmark
- Alken, Germany

== See also ==
- Alkan (disambiguation)
- Alkin
- Alkon (disambiguation)
- Alkene[s], unsaturated hydrocarbons that contain at least one carbon-carbon double bond
