= Mujan, Qom =

Village in Qom province, Iran

Mujan Persian: موجان
- Village
- Location within Iran
- Coordinates: 34°29′40″N 50°13′09″E
- Country: Iran
- Province: Qom
- County: Qom
- District: Khalajestan
- Rural District: Dastjerd

Population (2016)
  - Total: 121
- Time zone: UTC+3:30 (IRST)

Mujan (Persian: موجان) (Note: Also romanized as Mūjān; also known as Maūjān) is a village in Dastjerd Rural District of Khalajestan District in Qom County, Qom province, Iran.

== Demographics ==
=== Population ===
At the time of the 2006 National Census, the village's population was 170 in 63 households. The following census in 2011 counted 155 people in 61 households. The 2016 census measured the population of the village as 121 people in 54 households.
