= Alkan Air =

Canadian charter airline and air ambulance

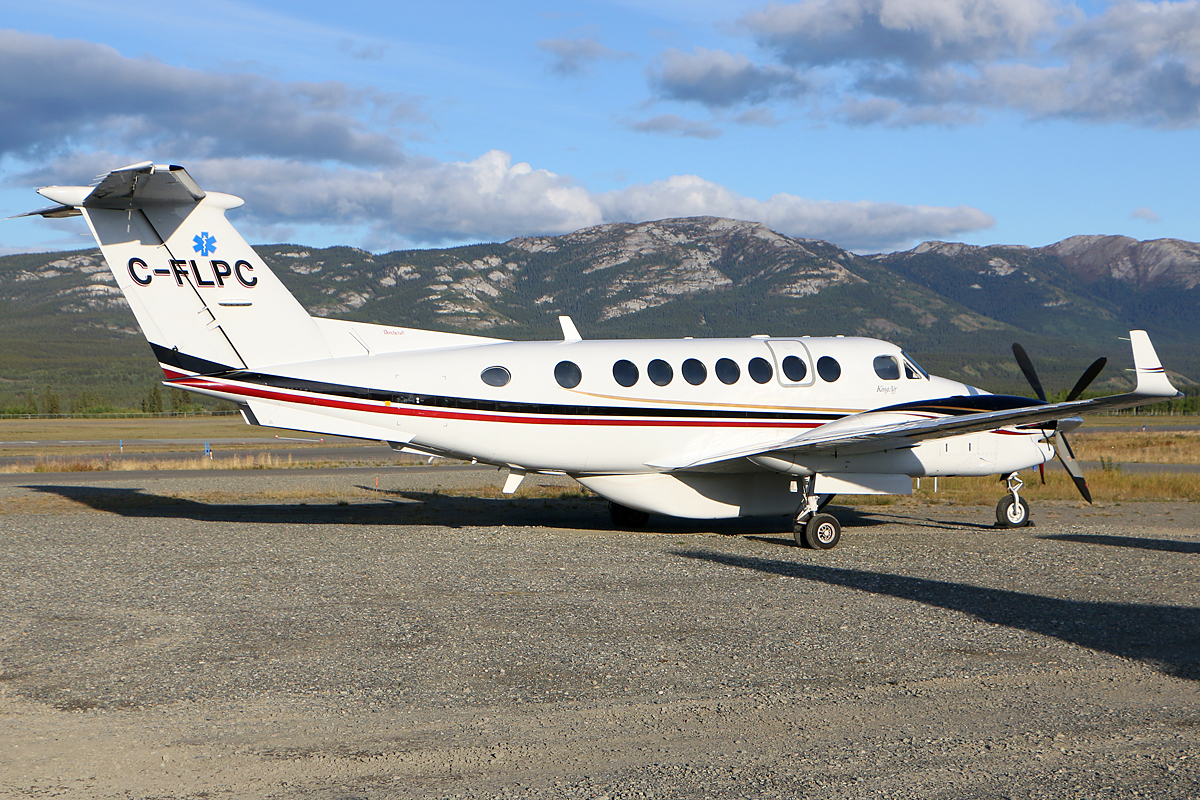
- Alkan Air Beech 300
IATA	ICAO	Call sign
-	AKN	ALKAN
- Founded: 1977
- AOC #: Canada: 3574; United States: BW7F467F
- Hubs: Whitehorse, Yukon
- Secondary hubs: Mayo, Yukon
- Fleet size: 15
- Headquarters: Whitehorse, Yukon, Canada
- Website: alkanair.com

Alkan Air Ltd. is an airline headquartered in Whitehorse, Yukon, Canada. The company operates seven-day-a-week charter and air ambulance (medevac) services. The Whitehorse and Mayo (seasonal) bases generally focus on wheel and floatplane charter and medevac services in northern and western Canada and Alaska.

From 2016 to 2018, Alkan also operated scheduled flights between Erik Nielsen Whitehorse International Airport and Watson Lake Airport.

== History ==
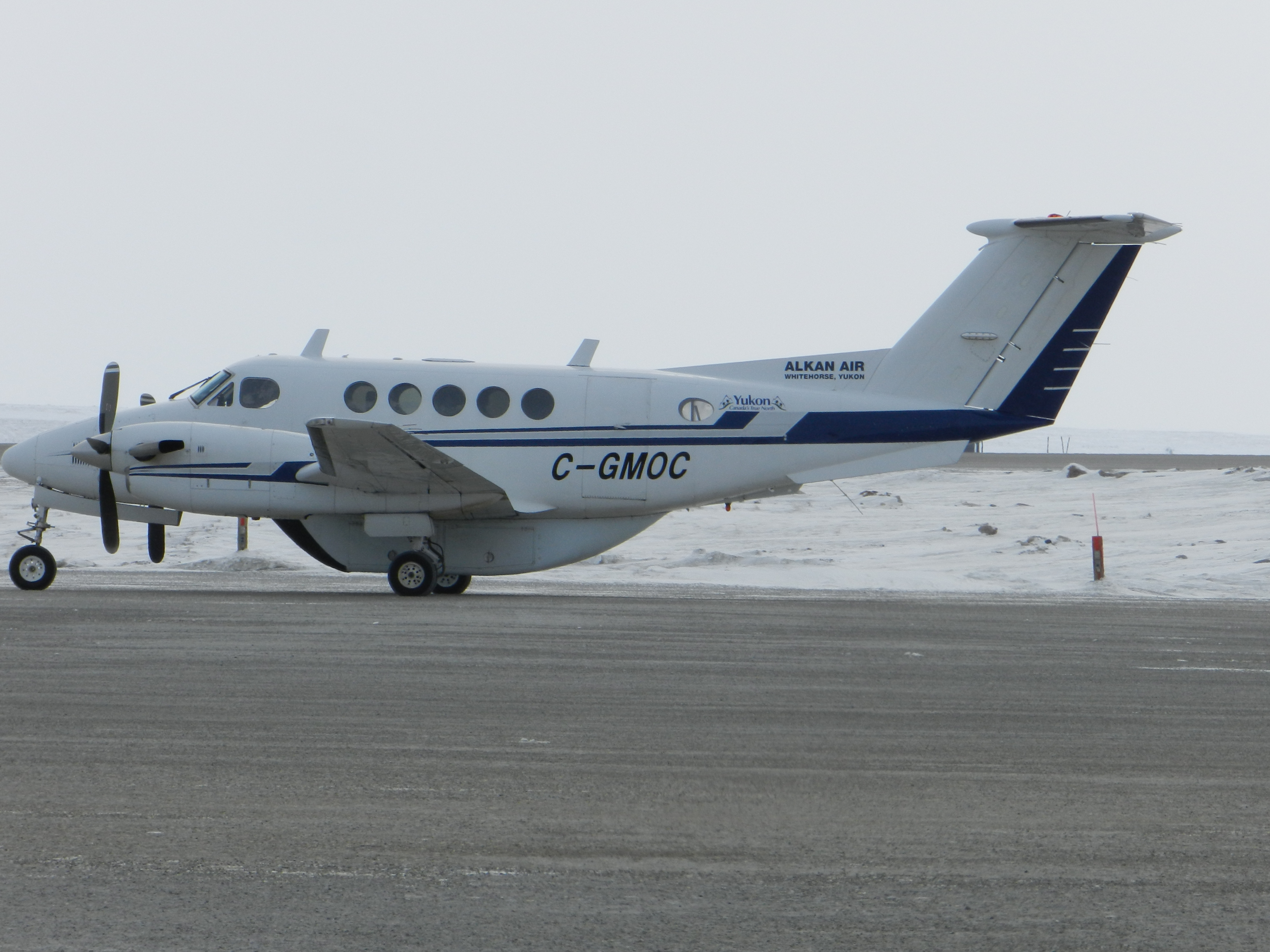
Alkan Air Beechcraft Super King Air at Cambridge Bay Airport

Alkan Air was formed in 1977 by Barry Watson and two Whitehorse businessmen, Win and Joe Muff. It was named in honour of the famous Alaska Highway or Al-Can Highway which skirts the City of Whitehorse. Hugh Kitchen became a partner in 1987 when Win and Joe Muff decided to sell their stake in the company in order to start a telecommunications business in Whitehorse.

The company began by operating a Cessna 206 on floats/skis and a Cessna 337 on wheels. Expansion soon followed and by 1987, when float and ski operations were discontinued, Alkan Air was one of the main providers of scheduled service in Yukon. In the early 1990s, the company gradually phased out scheduled flights in order to focus on charter operations. High performance, pressurized Beech King Airs were introduced in 1994.

Alkan Air primarily flies charter operations for hunting outfitters and government operations. Three Kings Airs are dedicated to flying medevacs for the Yukon Government.

In October 2015, Alkan Air opened a flight training school to accommodate a need in Yukon for people wanting to learn to fly. As of 2025, the flight school can train for private and commercial licenses, multi-engine and instrument ratings. In addition, Alkan Air can train air traffic controllers, and all aspects of airline operations.

== Fleet ==
As of 4 October 2026, Transport Canada lists the following aircraft:

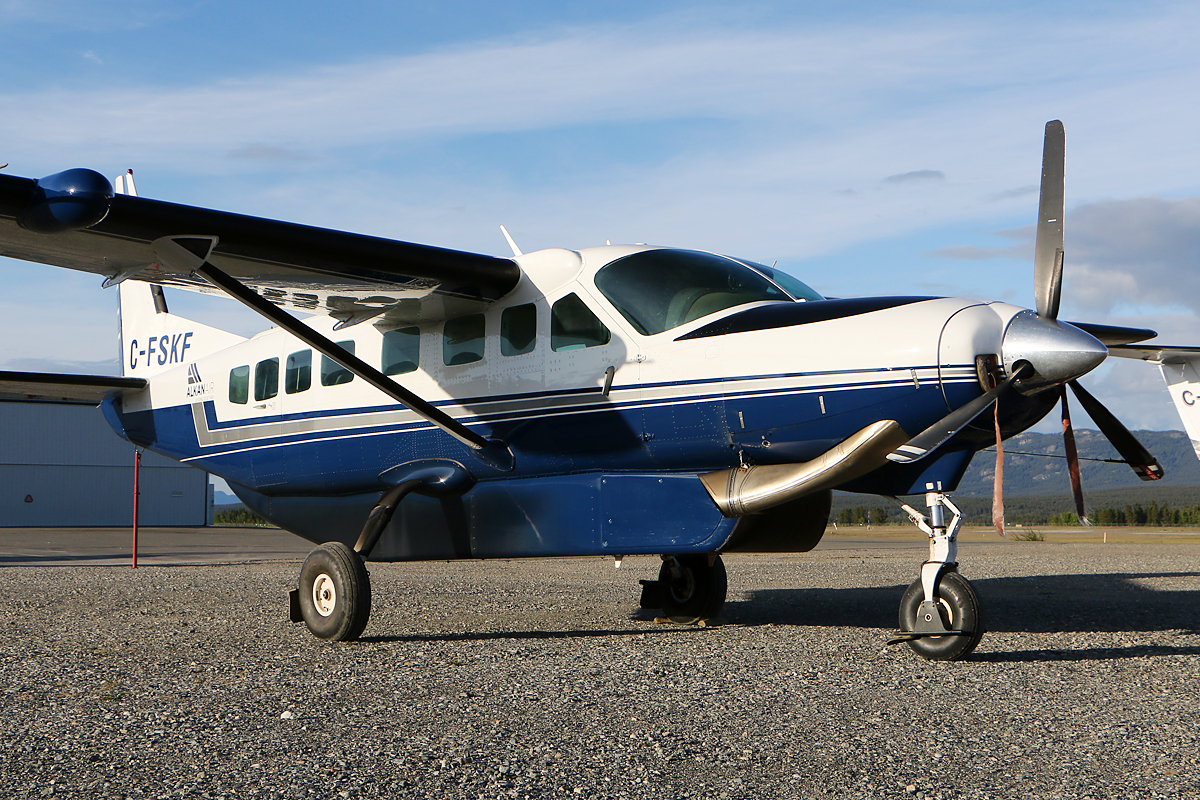
C-FSKF, the aircraft involved in the accident, pictured in Whitehorse approximately one year earlier

Alkan Air fleet
Aircraft	No. of aircraft	Variants	Notes
Beechcraft Super King Air	6	Super King Air 300	Based in Whitehorse, Yukon
Cessna 208 Caravan	4	1 - 208; 3 - 208B	Based in Yukon, floatplanes
De Havilland Canada DHC-2 Beaver	1	DHC-2 MK.I	Operated on floats
De Havilland Canada DHC-3 Otter	1	DHC-3-T Turbo-Otter	Both operate on wheels/skis in winter and floats in summer. Based in Yukon
De Havilland Canada DHC-6 Twin Otter	1	DHC-6 Series 300	Not listed at Alkan Air
Dornier 228	2	228-202	Based in Yukon
Total	15		

== Accidents and incidents ==
On August 6, 2019, a Cessna 208B (C-FSKF) crashed after flying into a box canyon near Mayo Airport killing the pilot and the only passenger. The aircraft had departed Rau strip, a remote airstrip serving a mineral exploration camp about 150 km (93 mi) northeast of Mayo. The Transportation Safety Board of Canada (TSB) investigation report into the accident was released on July 29, 2020, and identified poor pilot decision making in conditions of poor weather in mountainous terrain as a major cause of the crash.
