= Marvin C. Alkin =

American academic

Marvin C. Alkin (born 1934) is Professor Emeritus of Education at the University of California, Los Angeles. Alkin joined the UCLA faculty in 1964 after receiving his doctorate from the Stanford University Graduate School of Education. He has, at various times, served as Chair of the Education Department and Associate Dean of the Graduate School of Education and Information Studies. He was founder and former Director of the UCLA Center for the Study of Evaluation.

Alkin has received multiple awards from the American Educational Research Association (AERA) for outstanding evaluation reports and policy studies. In addition, he is one of only four people to receive both of the major scholarly awards of the American Evaluation Association (AEA). In 1996, he was the winner of the Paul F. Lazarsfeld Award for Lifelong Contributions to Evaluation Theory from AEA. In 2016, he received the Association’s Research on Evaluation Award for significant contributions to the study of evaluation.

Alkin has been editor or associate editor of eight academic journals, including the Educational Evaluation and Policy Analysis Journal, Evaluation Review, and Studies in Educational Evaluation. He also was executive editor of the Encyclopedia of Educational Research (6th Edition). He is currently co-editor of SAGE Publication’s Evaluation in Practice Series.

Alkin has been a consultant to numerous national governments and has directed program evaluations in 18 different countries. He is especially noted for his extensive research on evaluation utilization and comparative evaluation theory. His resume includes well over 150 published books, articles and chapters.

Alkin is noted for his work on Context Sensitive Evaluation, an approach derived from an understanding of factors found in the research literature that are associated with high levels of evaluation use.

== Education ==
A.B. in Mathematics, San Jose State University, 1956; M.A. in Education, San Jose State University, 1959; Ed.D. in Education, Stanford University, 1964.

== Selected publications ==
- Alkin, M. C., Vo, A.T., Christie, C.A. (2024). Evaluation essentials: From A to Z. (3rd ed.). New York, New York: Guilford Press.
- Alkin, M. (Editor). (2023) Evaluation roots: Theory Influencing Practice (3rd ed.). New York, New York: Guilford Press.
- Alkin, M. C. & Patton, M. Q. (2020). The birth and adaptation of evaluation theories. Journal of Multidisciplinary Evaluation, 16(35), 1-13.
- Alkin, M. & King, J. (2017). Definitions of evaluation use and misuse, evaluation influence, and factors affecting use. American Journal of Evaluation.
- Alkin, M. & King, J. (2016). The historical development of evaluation use. American Journal of Evaluation, 37(4).
- Alkin, M. (2013). Context Sensitive Evaluation. In M. Alkin, Editor. Evaluation Roots: A Wider Perspective of Theorists’ Views and Influences. Thousand Oaks, California: Sage.
- Alkin, M, Vo, A., & Christie, C. (2012). The evaluator’s role in valuing: Who and with whom. In G. Julnes (Ed.), Promoting valuation in the public interest: Informing policies for judging value in evaluation. New Directions for Evaluation, 133, 29-41.
- Alkin, Marvin C., Christie, Christina A., & Rose, Mike. (2006). In I. Shaw, J. Greene, and M. Mark, Eds. Communicating Evaluation in The Sage Handbook of Evaluation. Thousand Oaks, California: Sage.
- Alkin, M. & Taut, S. (2003) Unbundling evaluation use. Studies in Educational Evaluation. 29, 1-12.
- Alkin, M. (Editor in Chief) (1992). Encyclopedia of educational research, sixth edition. New York, NY: Macmillan Publishing Company.
- Alkin, M. (1990). Debates on evaluation. Newbury Park, California: Sage Publications.
- Alkin, M., & Coyle, K. (1988). Thoughts on evaluation utilization, misutilization, and non-utilization. Studies in Educational Evaluation, 14, 331-340.
- Alkin, M. (1985). A guide for evaluation decision-makers. Beverly Hills, California: Sage Publications.
- Alkin, M., & Solmon, L. (Editors) (1983). The costs of evaluation. Beverly Hills, California: Sage Publications.
- Alkin, M., Daillak, R., & White, P. (1979). Using evaluations: Does evaluation make a difference? (Volume 76). Sage Library of Social Research. Beverly Hills, California: Sage Publications.
- Alkin, M. (1973). Theoretical framework for the analysis of curriculum and instructional reform. International Review of Education (UNESCO), 19(2), 195-207.
