= Deh Sorkh, Razavi Khorasan =

Deh Sorkh دهسرخ
- Village
- Location within Iran
- Coordinates: 36°33′40″N 59°43′58″E
- Country: Iran
- Province: Razavi Khorasan
- County: Mashhad
- Bakhsh: Central
- Rural District: Tabadkan

Population (2006)
  - Total: 415
- Time zone: UTC+3:30 (IRST)
  - Summer (DST): UTC+4:30 (IRDT)

Deh Sorkh (Persian: دهسرخ; also known as Deh Sorkh-e Pā’īn and Deh Sorkh-e Soflá) is a village in Tabadkan Rural District, in the Central District of Mashhad County, Razavi Khorasan Province, Iran. At the 2006 census, its population was 415, in 105 families.
