= Alkon =

Russian drink company

PLC «Alkon»
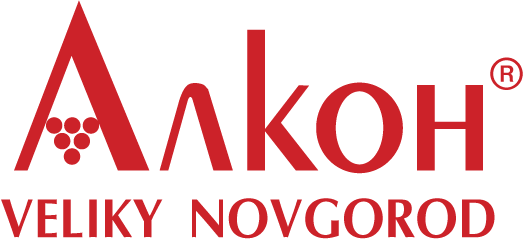
- Type: Public Limited Company
- Industry: Alcoholic beverages production
- Founded: 1897; 129 years ago
- Headquarters: Russian Federation: Veliky Novgorod
- Products: Vodka, nastoyka, nalivka, balsam
- Revenue: $2.37 million (2017)
- Operating income: −$408,654 (2017)
- Net income: −$333,083 (2017)
- Total assets: $9.43 million (2017)
- Total equity: $1.91 million (2017)
- Website: www.alkon.su

Alkon Distillery (Russian: ОАО «Алкон») is a Russian company which produces various alcohol products, vodkas, nastoykas, nalivkas and balsams. The company is one of the oldest distilleries in the country, founded in 1897.

== History ==
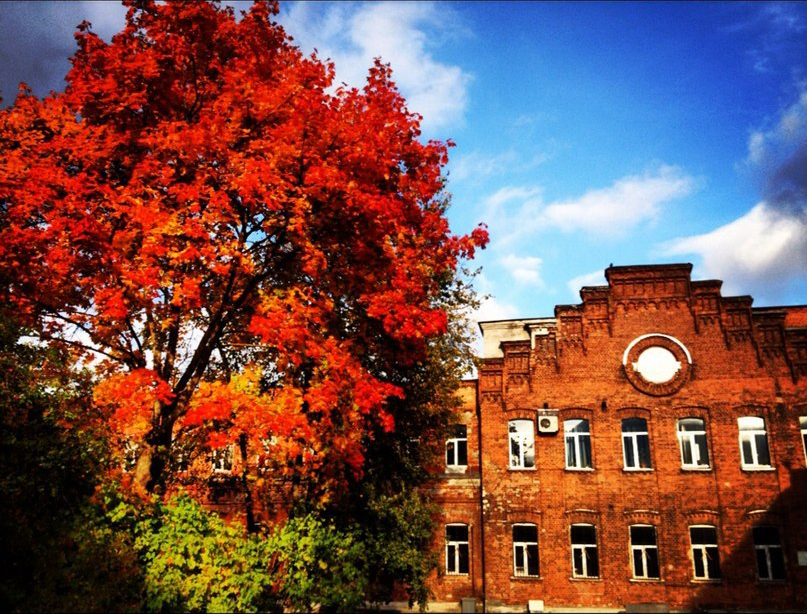
Alkon Distillery.

The manufactory was founded in 1897 by Ivan Korsakov, who recognized that native citizens of ancient Novgorod were renowned for their skill in producing excellent vodka, which delighted overseas connoisseurs of alcoholic beverages since the 13th-15th centuries—taking advantage of the water quality of Lake Ilmen and other water sources that surround Veliky Novgorod.

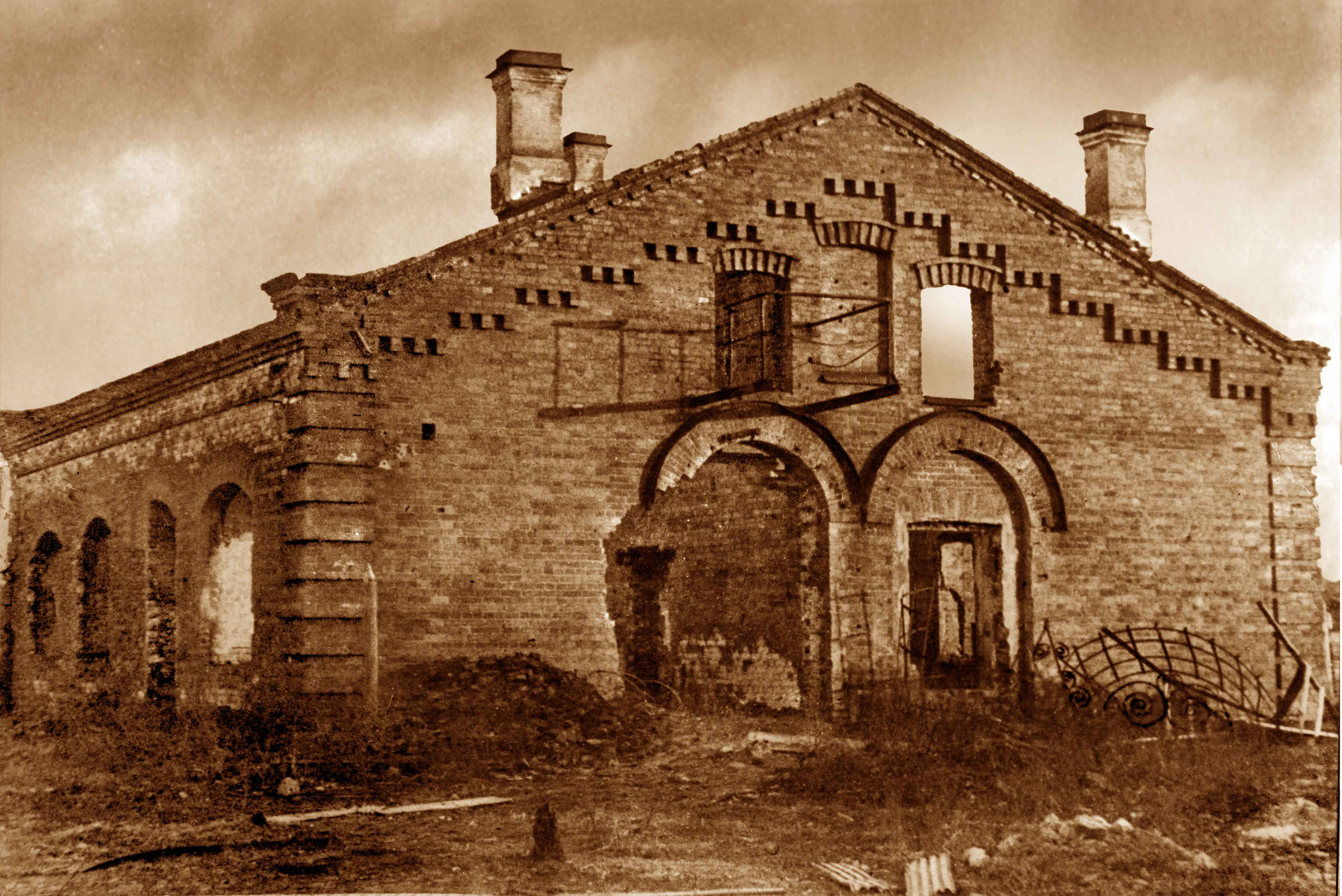
The main building of the distillery destroyed during WWII.

During World War II, the distillery suffered major damage. The reconstruction of the destroyed manufactory began in July 1944; a few months later, production of 40% ABV vodka in casks began. Ffront 100 grams" were sent to military units.

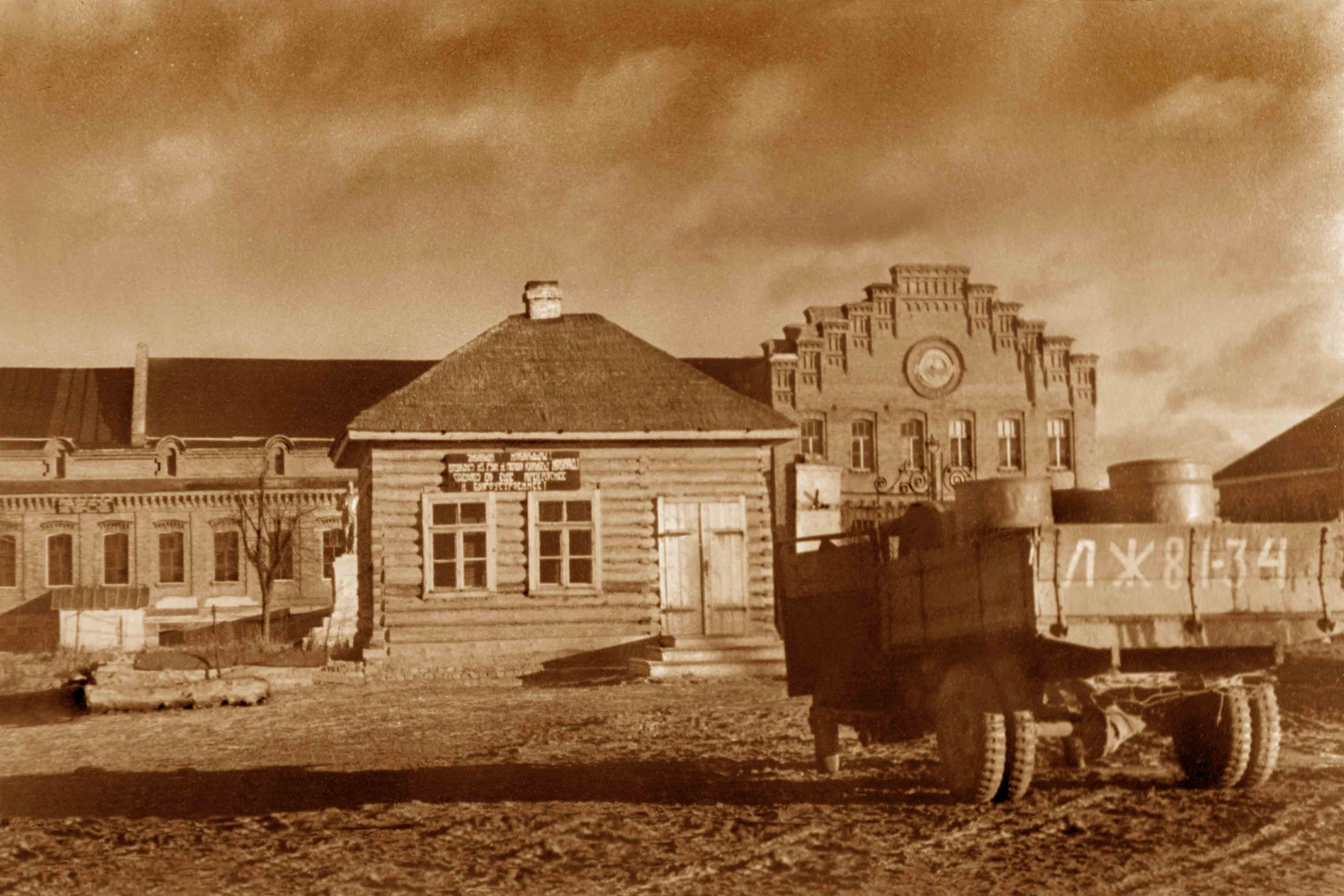
After WWII 40% ABV vodka was casked.

The wine storage and wine department, with a capacity of 600,000 decaliters, was opened in 1960. The wine warehouse was built in 1964, and the bottling department was built in 1966.

In 1992, the manufacturer got the status of a Public corporation and a new name, PLC Alkon.

In 1996, Alkon, together with the Dovgan-protected manufacturing company, established a special program that effectively protected beverages from counterfeiting. For the implementation of this program, the distillery mastered the production of a new elite vodka assortment under the Dovgan trademark.

== Production ==
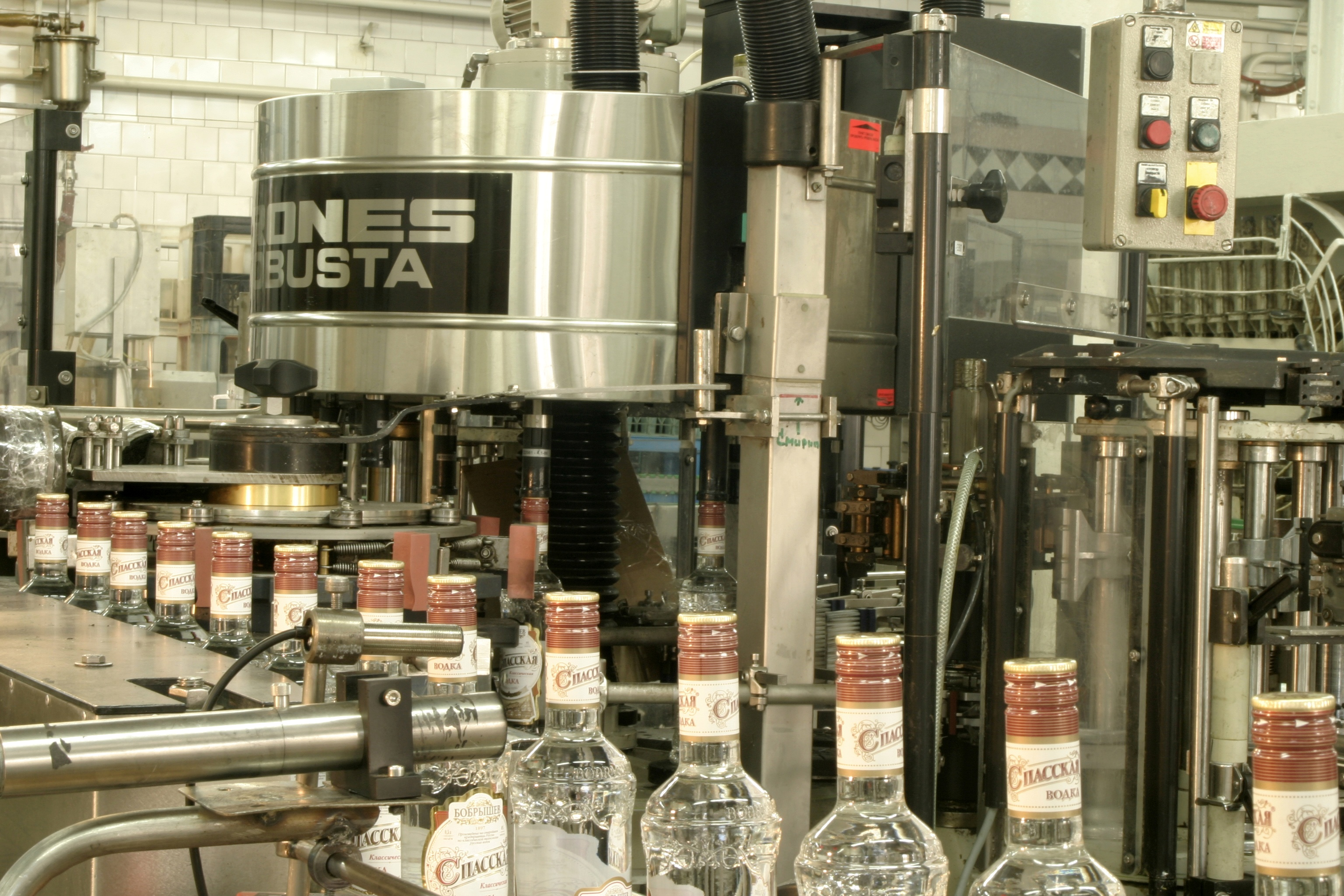
Bottling line.

The majority of operating production lines were projected especially for Alkon. The new high-tech equipment enables continuous improvement in material processing, product bottling, and quality control, as well as protecting manufactured goods from counterfeiting.

Alkon has an industrial-engineering laboratory. It is in the Novgorod region. Laboratory employees maintain control over all stages of product manufacturing components.

== Brands ==
- Vodkas: Veliky Novgorod, Novgorodskoe Veche, Alkon, Tysyatskaya, Posadskaya

== Literature ==
1. Бобрышев Ю.И., Золотарёв В.В., Ватковский Г.И., Гагарин М.М., Смирнов А.П. История винокурения, продажи питей, акцизной политики Руси и России в археологических находках и документах XII-XIX вв. — М. : Кругозор-наука, 2004. — p. 160. — ISBN 5-900888-18-5.
2. Романов С. История русской водки — М. : Вече, 1998. — p. 448. — ISBN 5-7838-0202-6.
3. Сергиенко Н.Н., Бобрышев Ю.И., Никулин Ю.А., Мазалов Н.В. Смирнов А.П. Русская водка — М. : Издательство фирмы «Кругозор», 1998. — p. 364. — ISBN 5-900888-05-3.
4. Новгородский винно-водочный завод. - Историческая справка №477 от 15.07.1992. - Государственный архив Новгородской области.
