= Saint-Germain-de-Grave =

- Commune
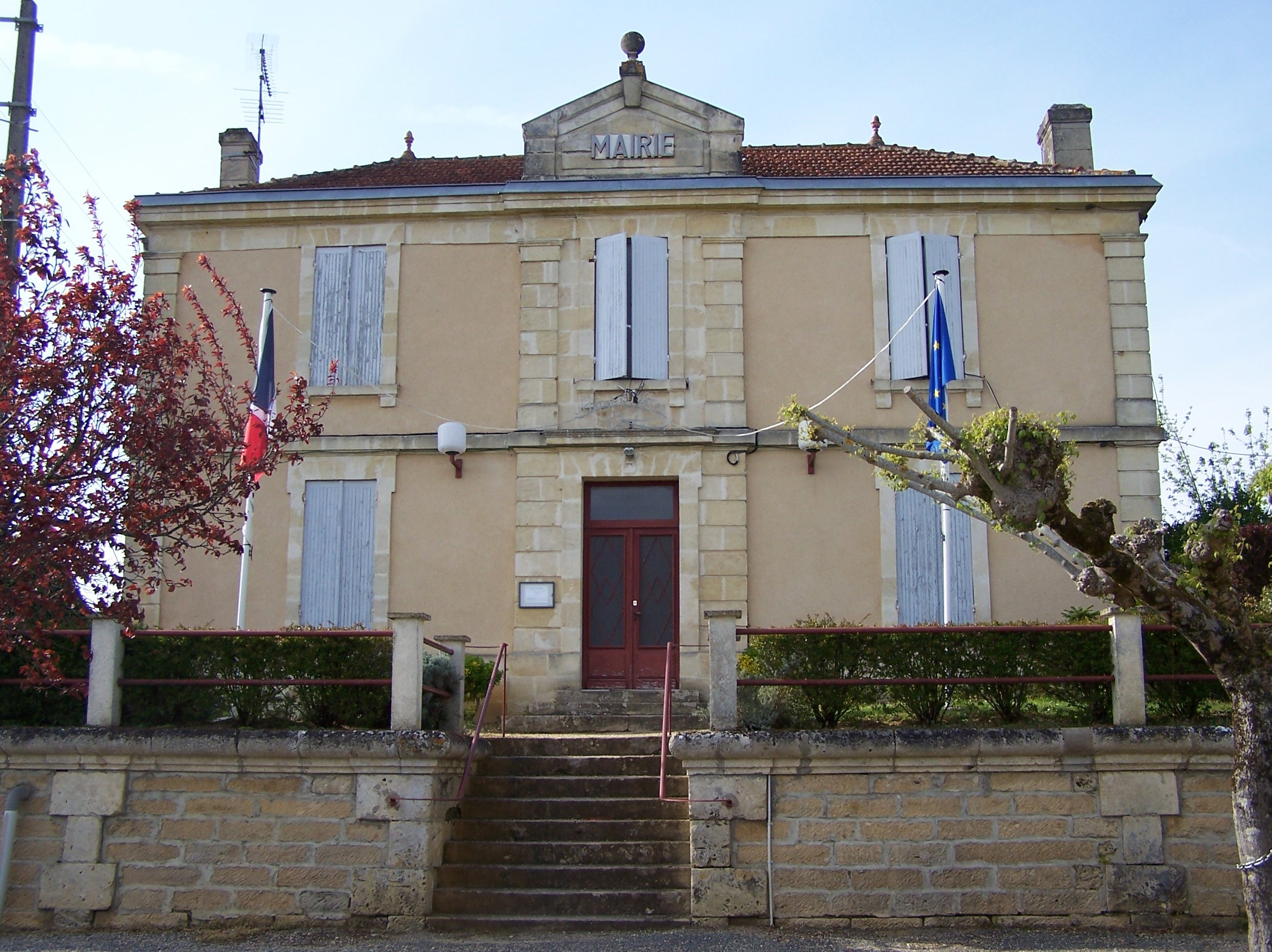
- The town hall in Saint-Germain-de-Grave

- Coat of arms
- Location of Saint-Germain-de-Grave
- Location within France Location within Nouvelle-Aquitaine
- Coordinates: 44°37′36″N 0°13′13″W
- Country: France
- Region: Nouvelle-Aquitaine
- Department: Gironde
- Arrondissement: Langon
- Canton: L'Entre-Deux-Mers

Government
  - Mayor (2020–2026): Denis Chaussié
- Area^{1}: 6.16 km^{2} (2.38 sq mi)
- Elevation: 107 m (351 ft)
- Highest elevation: 119 m (390 ft)
- Lowest elevation: 37 m (121 ft)
- Population (2023): 144
  - Density: 23.4/km^{2} (60.5/sq mi)
- Time zone: UTC+01:00 (CET)
  - Summer (DST): UTC+02:00 (CEST)
- INSEE/Postal code: 33411 /33490
- ^{1} French Land Register data, which excludes lakes, ponds, glaciers > 1 km^{2} (0.386 sq mi or 247 acres) and river estuaries.

Saint-Germain-de-Grave (French pronunciation: [sɛ̃ ʒɛʁmɛ̃ də ɡʁav]; Occitan: Sent German de Grava) is a commune in the Gironde department in Nouvelle-Aquitaine in southwestern France.

== Population ==
Historical population
Year	Pop.	±% p.a.
1968	193	—
1975	169	−1.88%
1982	171	+0.17%
1990	145	−2.04%
1999	155	+0.74%
2007	151	−0.33%
2012	148	−0.40%
2017	166	+2.32%
2023	144	−2.34%
Source: INSEE

== See also ==
- Communes of the Gironde department
