= Sorkh Deh, Qom =

Sorkh Deh سرخده
- Village
- Location within Iran
- Coordinates: 34°29′05″N 50°13′35″E
- Country: Iran
- Province: Qom
- County: Qom
- Bakhsh: Khalajestan
- Rural District: Dastjerd

Population (2006)
  - Total: 94
- Time zone: UTC+3:30 (IRST)
  - Summer (DST): UTC+4:30 (IRDT)

Sorkh Deh (Persian: سرخده, also Romanized as Sorkhdeh; also known as Sorkheh Deh and Surkhādeh) is a village in Dastjerd Rural District, Khalajestan District, Qom County, Qom Province, Iran. At the 2006 census, its population was 94, in 29 families.
