= Sorkheh Deh, Harsin =

Sorkheh Deh سرخه ده
- Village
- Location within Iran
- Coordinates: 34°15′24″N 47°23′35″E
- Country: Iran
- Province: Kermanshah
- County: Harsin
- Bakhsh: Central
- Rural District: Cheshmeh Kabud

Population (2006)
  - Total: 231
- Time zone: UTC+3:30 (IRST)
  - Summer (DST): UTC+4:30 (IRDT)

Sorkheh Deh (Persian: سرخه ده) is a village in Cheshmeh Kabud Rural District, in the Central District of Harsin County, Kermanshah Province, Iran. At the 2006 census, its population was 231, in 45 families.
