= Alcon (computer virus) =

Computer virus

Malware details
- Aliases: RSY, Kendesm, Ken&Desmond, Ether
- Type: DOS
- Subtype: Boot virus
- Classification: Virus
- Isolation date: 1997

Alcon, or RSY (which is more or less as commonly used of a name as Alcon), is a computer virus that was discovered to be spreading in Europe in 1997. It is a boot virus.

== Infection ==
Alcon is a standard boot sector virus that spreads via floppies. Instead of the MBR, it infects the DBR, making some antivirus programs miss it.

== Symptoms ==
Alcon contains no notable symptoms beyond one extremely damaging one, which is overwriting random information. Assuming that the overwrites are subtle, this may result in significant compounding data over time, as Alcon is a slow damager.

Alcon contains the text "R.SY".

== Prevalence ==
Alcon was listed as being spreading by the WildList from April 1998 to July 1999. F-Secure lists it as having been common in Europe throughout 1997. Like most boot viruses, it is near extinct, although it was certainly in the last wave of boot viruses, so cases involving Alcon may be false positives, but may also be due to older, unused infected disks resurfacing.

== Aliases and variants ==
Alcon's most common alias is RSY, based on inclusions in the virus code. Other aliases include Kendesm, Ken&Desmond, and Ether. It is unknown where these names are derived from.

This virus is unrelated to W32/Alcon.
