= Alcón =

Alcón (Spanish: los Alcónes, English: the Alcóns) is a surname. Notable people with the surname include:

- Alfredo Alcón (1930–2014), Argentine actor
- Eliseo Alcon (1950 or 1951–2025), American politician in New Mexico
- Eva Alcón Soler (born 1963), Spanish academic
- Manuel Alcón (died 1962), Argentine actor and musician
