= Dastjerd =

City in Qom province, Iran

Dastjerd Persian: دستجرد
- City
- Location within Iran
- Coordinates: 34°32′56″N 50°14′38″E
- Country: Iran
- Province: Qom
- County: Qom
- District: Khalajestan

Population (2016)
  - Total: 1,525
- Time zone: UTC+3:30 (IRST)

Dastjerd (Persian: دستجرد) (Note: Also known as Dastgird) is a city in, and the capital of, Khalajestan District in Qom County, Qom province, Iran. It also serves as the administrative center for Dastjerd Rural District.

== Demographics ==
=== Population ===
At the time of the 2006 National Census, the city's population was 1,121 in 351 households. The following census in 2011 counted 1,334 people in 458 households. The 2016 census measured the population of the city as 1,525 people in 517 households.
