= Deh Sorkheh, Hamadan =

Deh Sorkheh ده سرخه
- Village
- Location within Iran
- Coordinates: 34°19′34″N 48°21′49″E
- Country: Iran
- Province: Hamadan
- County: Nahavand
- Bakhsh: Central
- Rural District: Tariq ol Eslam

Population (2006)
  - Total: 476
- Time zone: UTC+3:30 (IRST)
  - Summer (DST): UTC+4:30 (IRDT)

Deh Sorkheh (Persian: ده سرخه) is a village in Tariq ol Eslam Rural District, in the Central District of Nahavand County, Hamadan Province, Iran. At the 2006 census, its population was 476, in 96 families.
