= Anjileh, Kurdistan =

Anjileh انجيله
- Village
- Location within Iran
- Coordinates: 35°58′22″N 45°57′53″E
- Country: Iran
- Province: Kurdistan
- County: Baneh
- Bakhsh: Nanur
- Rural District: Buin

Population (2006)
  - Total: 128
- Time zone: UTC+3:30 (IRST)
  - Summer (DST): UTC+4:30 (IRDT)

Anjileh (Persian: انجيله, also Romanized as Anjīleh; also known as Anjila and Hansīleh) is a village in Buin Rural District, Nanur District, Baneh County, Kurdistan Province, Iran. At the 2006 census, its population was 128, in 25 families. The village is populated by Kurds.
