= Watson Lake Airport =

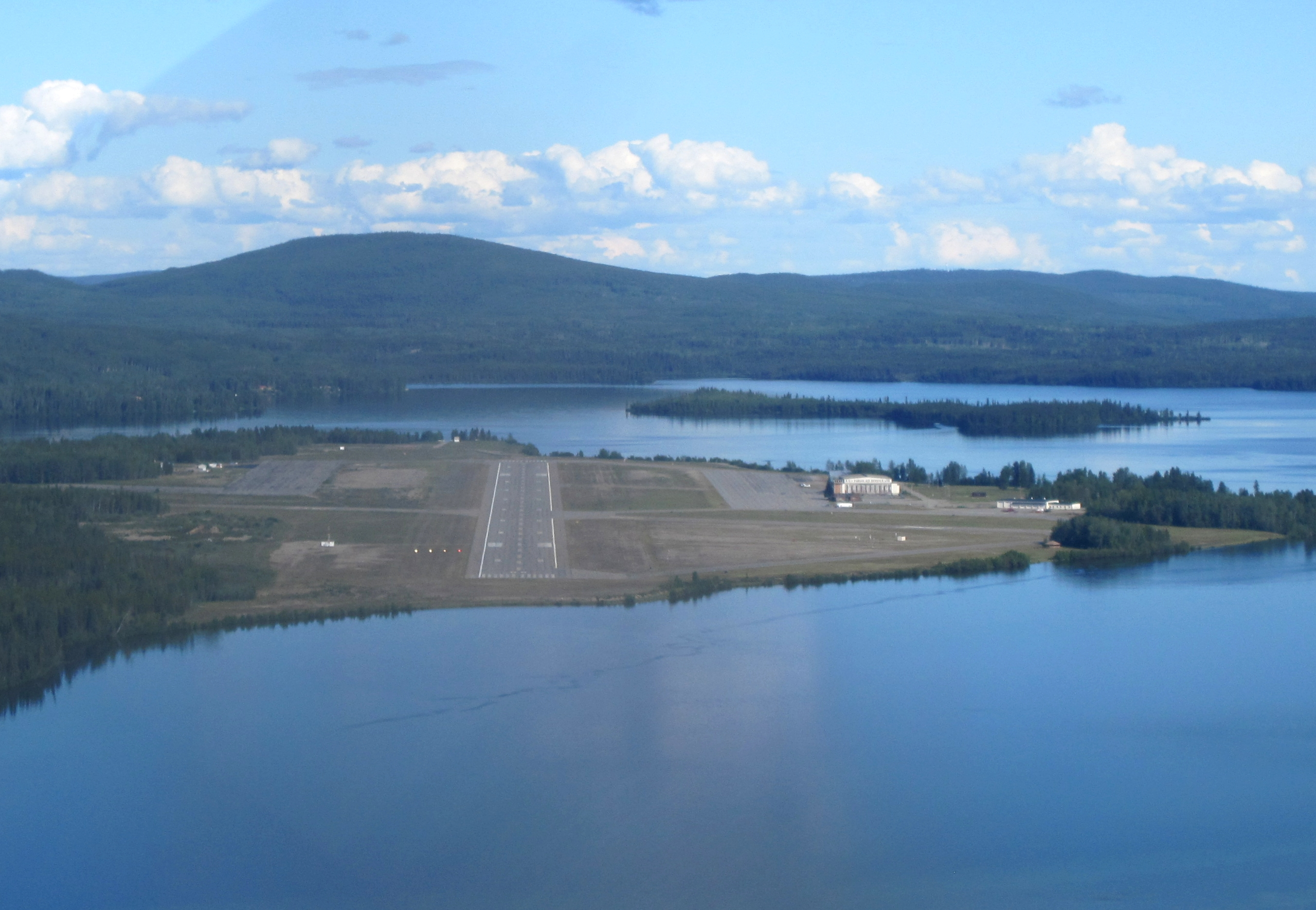
- Watson Lake Airport, Watson Lake, Yukon

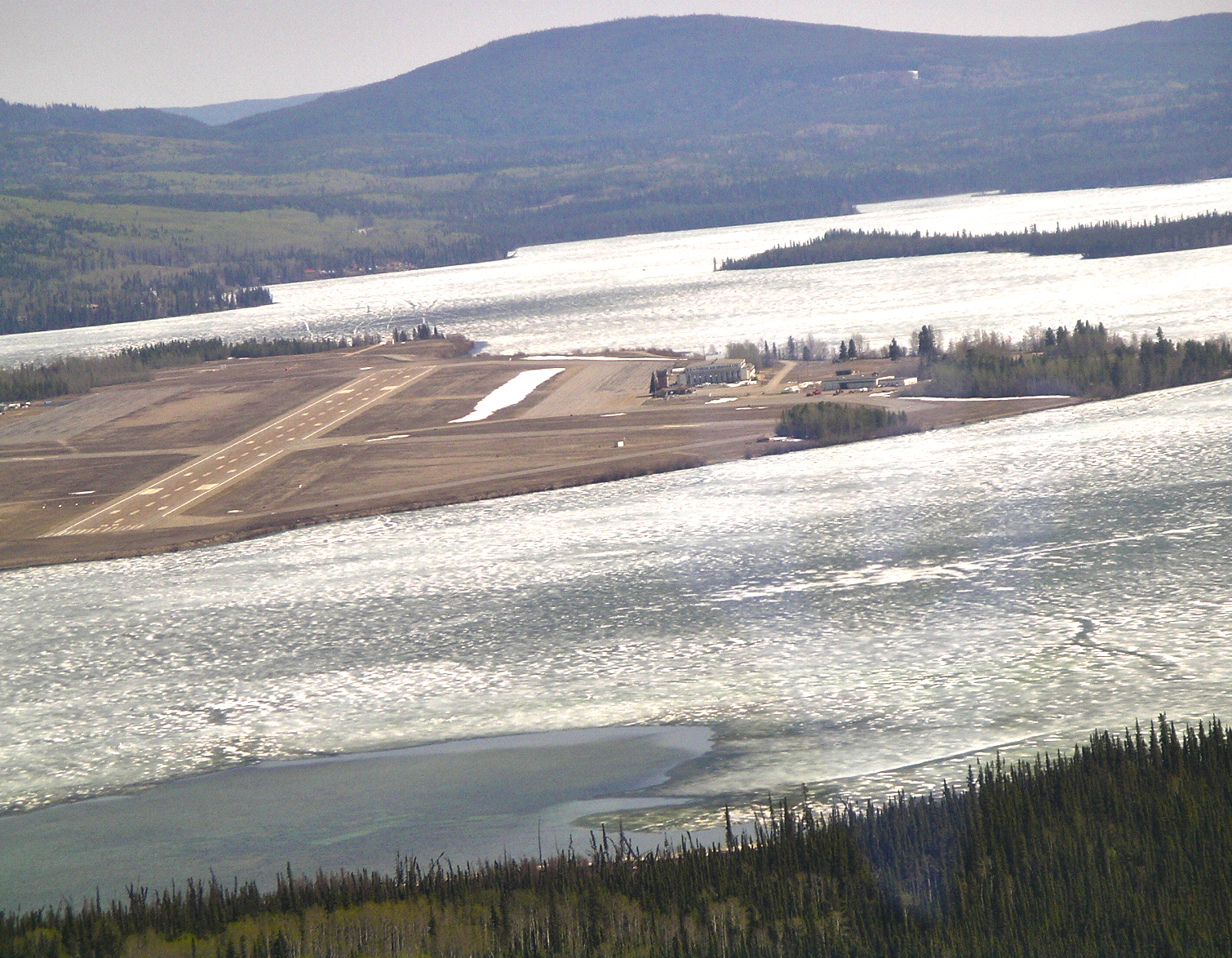
- Watson Lake airport from the air
- IATA: YQH; ICAO: CYQH; WMO: 71953

Summary
- Airport type: Public
- Operator: Government of Yukon
- Location: Watson Lake, Yukon
- Time zone: MST (UTC−07:00)
- Elevation AMSL: 2,255 ft / 687 m
- Coordinates: 60°06′59″N 128°49′21″W

Map
- Location in Yukon

Runways
Direction	Length		Surface
Direction	ft	m	Surface
09/27	5,504	1,678	Asphalt

Statistics (2010)
- Aircraft movements: 4,602
- Sources: Canada Flight Supplement; Environment Canada; Movements from Statistics Canada.

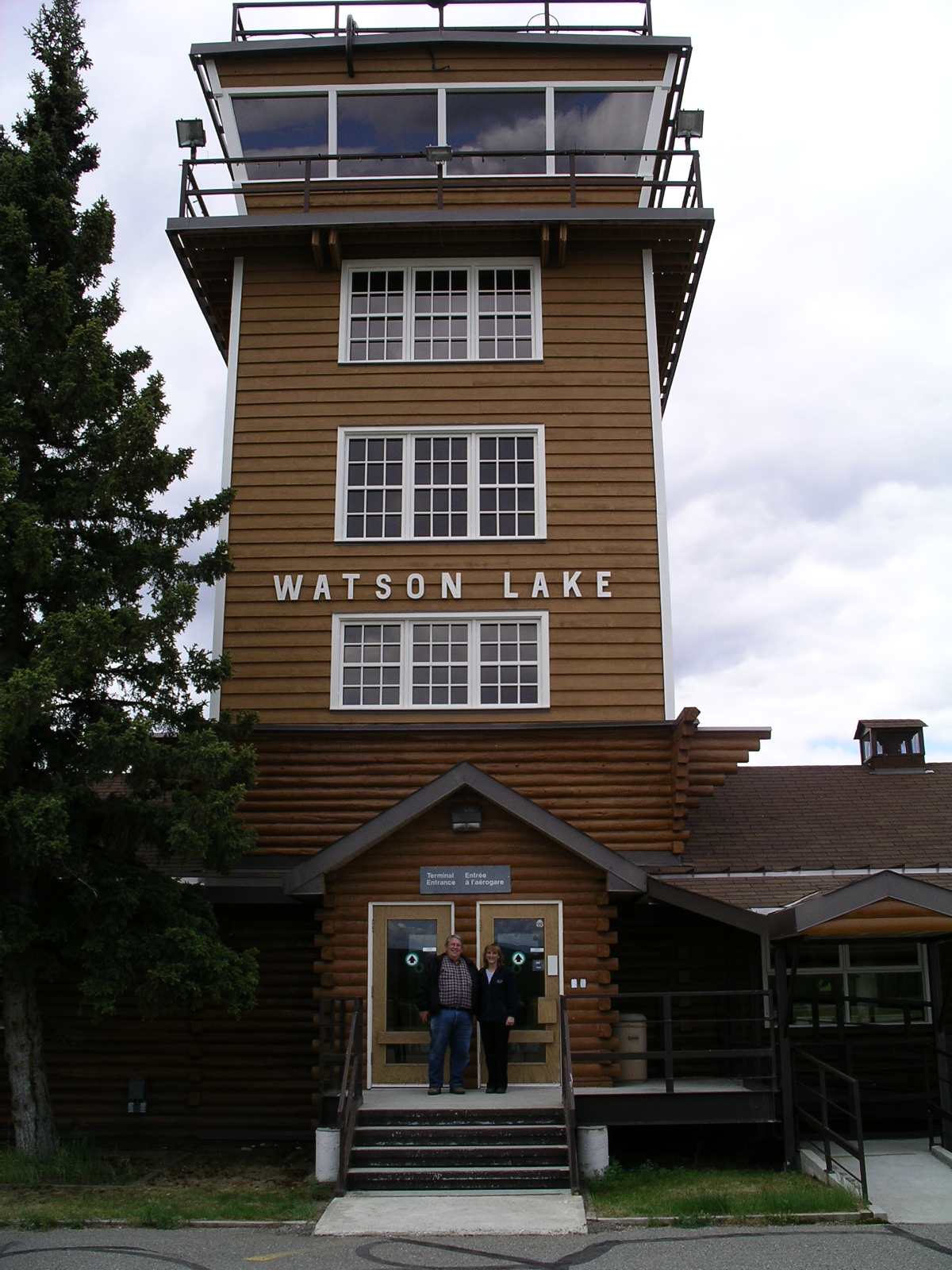
The old Watson Lake Control Tower

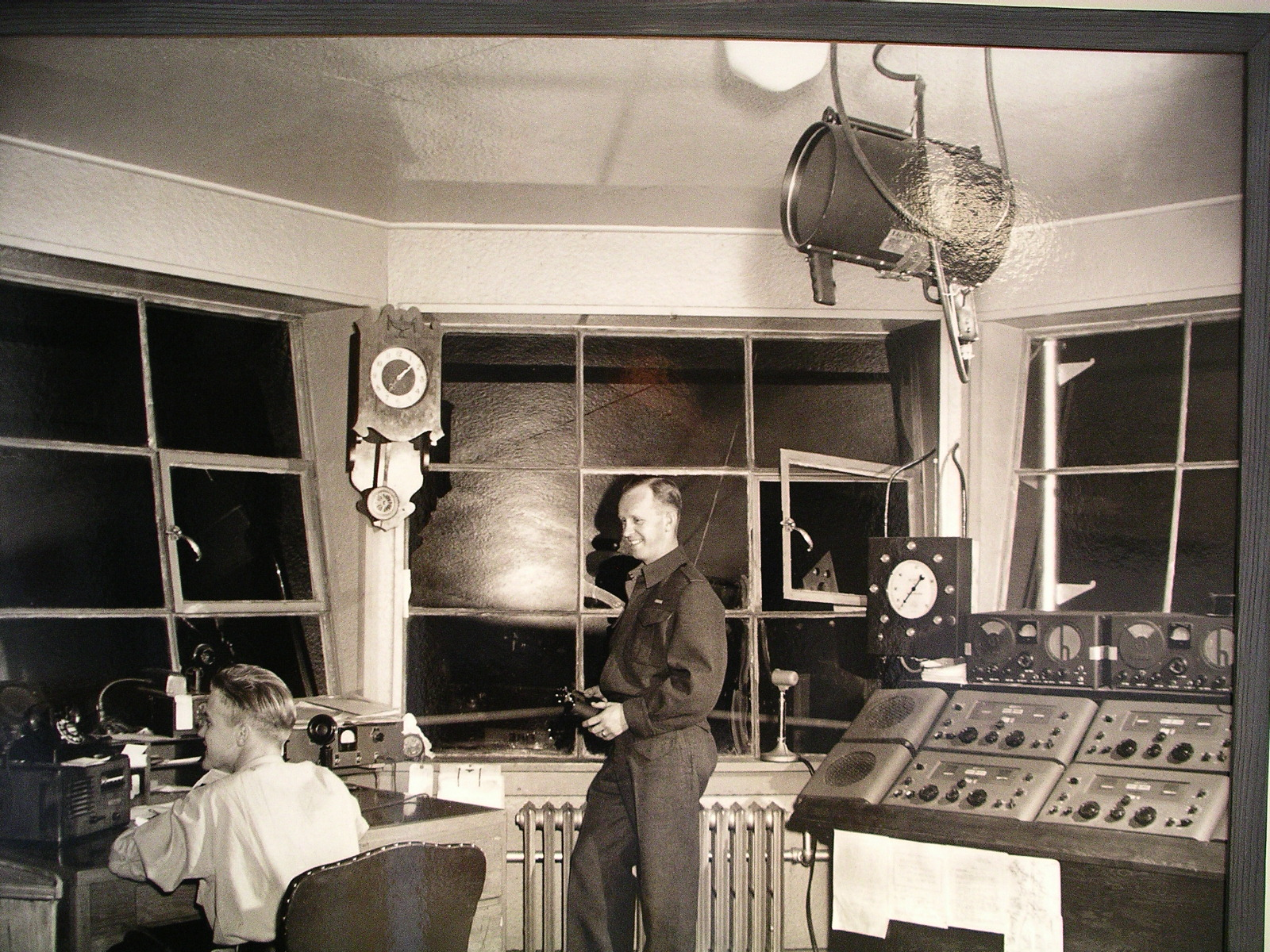
World War II Controllers

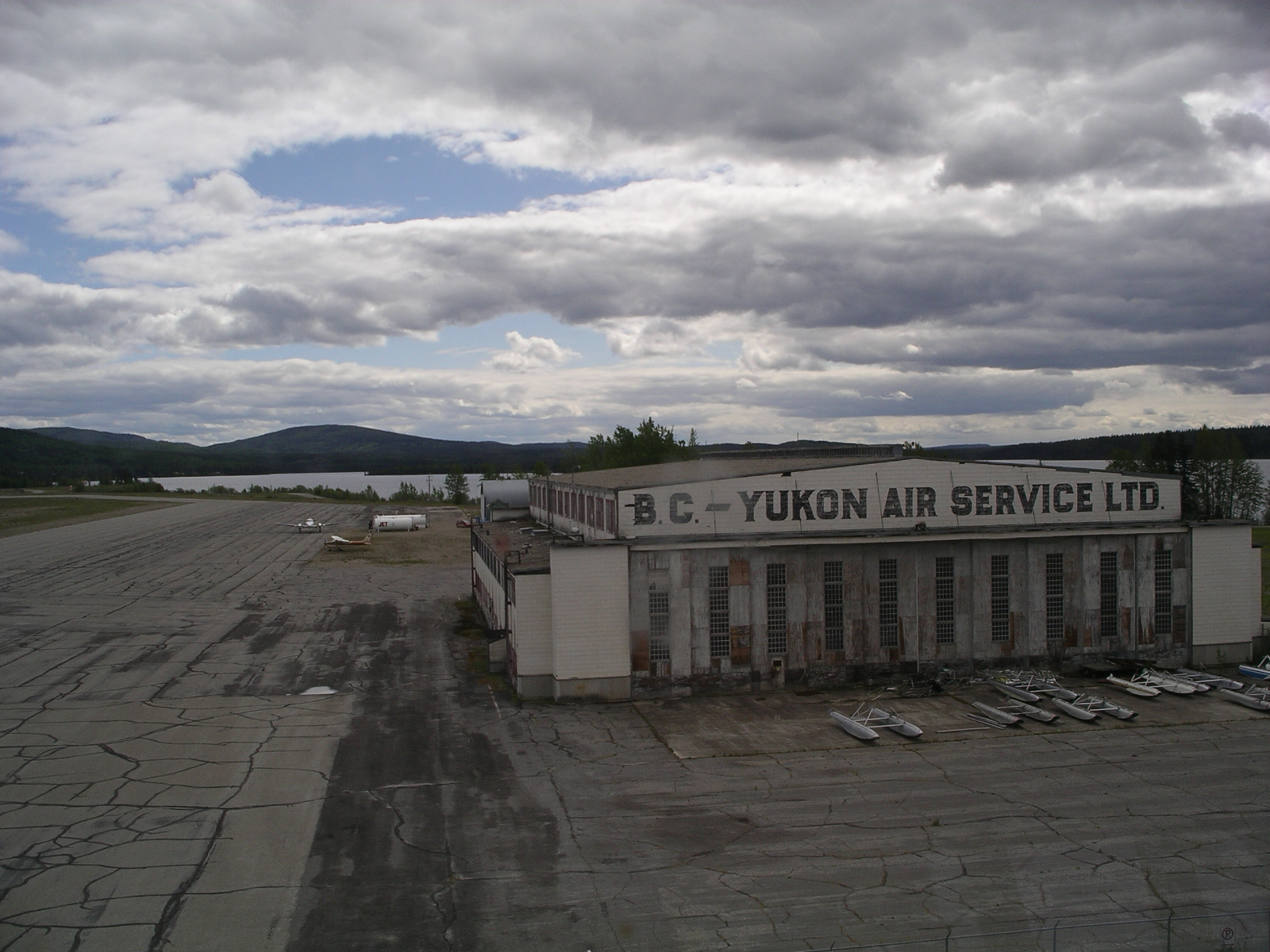
Hangar at Watson Lake

Watson Lake Airport (IATA: YQH, ICAO: CYQH) is located 5 nautical miles (9.3 km; 5.8 mi) west of Watson Lake, Yukon, Canada, and is operated by the Yukon government. The paved asphalt runway is 5,504 by 150 feet (1,678 m × 46 m) land is at an elevation of 2,255 ft (687 m).

== Historical airline service ==
Commencing in the early 1940s, scheduled passenger service was operated in the past by Canadian Pacific Air Lines and its successors CP Air and Canadian Airlines International to Vancouver, British Columbia; Edmonton, Alberta; Whitehorse, Yukon; Fort Nelson, British Columbia; Fort St. John, British Columbia and Prince George, British Columbia. CP Air served the airport with Boeing 737-200 jetliners during the 1970s with direct, no change of plane flights to all of the above destinations; however, this jet service ended as a result of deregulation. Other Canadian Pacific flights into the airport over the years were operated with such twin engine prop aircraft as the Lockheed Lodestar, the Douglas DC-3 and the Convair 240 as well as with the larger, four engine Douglas DC-6B propliner and the Bristol Britannia turboprop.

Passenger service was also provided in the mid 1990s by several regional and commuter airlines such as Central Mountain Air flying Beechcraft twin turboprop aircraft and Alkan Air operating Piper Navajo aircraft.

As of September 12, 2016, Alkan Air resumed thrice-weekly scheduled service between Watson Lake and Whitehorse. The service ended at the end of September 2018.

== See also ==
- Watson Lake Water Aerodrome
