= Eugène Alcan =

French painter

Eugène Alcan (1811 – c. 1898) was a French Jewish litterateur, painter, and poet, who embraced Roman Catholic Christianity. He was born in Paris in 1811, and died about 1898. He was a brother of Alphonse Alkan, but the reason for the difference in the orthography of the family name has never been explained.

Alcan was the author of the following works:

- La Légende des Âmes: Souvenirs de Quelques Conférences de Saint Vincent de Paul (1879)
- La Flore Printanière: Souvenirs du Berceau et de la Première Enfance (1882)
- La Flore du Calvaire: Traits Caractéristiques de Quelques Voies Douloureuses (1884)
- Les Cannibales et Leur Temps: Souvenir de la Campagne de l'Océanie sous le Commandant Marceau, Capitaine de Frégate (1887)
- Les Grands Dévouements et l'Impôt du Sang (1890)
- Récits Instructifs du Père Balthazar (1892)
