= Deh Sorkh, Ravansar =

Deh Sorkh ده سرخ
- Village
- Location within Iran
- Coordinates: 34°39′32″N 46°27′51″E
- Country: Iran
- Province: Kermanshah
- County: Ravansar
- Bakhsh: Central
- Rural District: Dowlatabad

Population (2006)
  - Total: 171
- Time zone: UTC+3:30 (IRST)
  - Summer (DST): UTC+4:30 (IRDT)

Deh Sorkh (Persian: ده سرخ) is a village in Dowlatabad Rural District, in the Central District of Ravansar County, Kermanshah Province, Iran. At the 2006 census, its population was 171, in 26 families.
