= Deh Sorkheh, Selseleh =

Deh Sorkheh ده سرخه
- Village
- Location within Iran
- Coordinates: 33°50′32″N 48°13′44″E
- Country: Iran
- Province: Lorestan
- County: Selseleh
- Bakhsh: Central
- Rural District: Doab

Population (2006)
  - Total: 76
- Time zone: UTC+3:30 (IRST)
  - Summer (DST): UTC+4:30 (IRDT)

Deh Sorkheh (Persian: ده سرخه' also known as Deh-e Sorkh) is a village in Doab Rural District, in the Central District of Selseleh County, Lorestan Province, Iran. At the 2006 census, its population was 76, in 14 families.
