= Alphonse Alkan =

Alphonse Alkan (also known as Alphonse the Elder, 1809 in Paris – 1889 in Neuilly-sur-Seine) was a French printer, bibliographer, and author. He was a brother of Eugène Alcan but the reason for the difference in the orthography of the family name has never been explained. He first worked as a practical printer, then wrote for various typographical and bibliographical reviews, and subsequently was appointed secretary and proof-reader to the Count de Clarac, keeper of the Museum of Antiquities in the Louvre. Alkan was a prolific writer and the author of many books, pamphlets, and articles, which deal with the art and history of printing and illustrating as well as with bibliography.

The Jewish Encyclopedia lists his most important books as:

- Les Femmes Compositrices d'Imprimerie sous la Révolution Française de 1794, par un Ancien Typographe, 1862 (anonymous)
- Les Graveurs de Portraits en France, 1879
- Documents pour Servir à l'Histoire de la Librairie Parisienne, 1879
- Les Livres et Leurs Ennemis, 1883
- Les Etiquettes et les Inscriptions des Boîtes-Volumes de Pierre Jannet, Fondateur de la Bibliothèque Elzéverienne, 1883
- Edouard René Lefèbvre de Laboulaye, un Fondeur en Caractères, Membre de l'Institut, 1886
- Berbignier et SonLivre: les Farfadets, 1889
- Les Quatre Doyens de la Typographie Parisienne, 1889
