= Sorkheh Deh-e Olya =

Sorkheh Deh-e Olya سرخه ده عليا
- Village
- Location within Iran
- Coordinates: 33°22′00″N 48°22′00″E
- Country: Iran
- Province: Lorestan
- County: Khorramabad
- Bakhsh: Central
- Rural District: Koregah-e Sharqi

Population (2006)
  - Total: 201
- Time zone: UTC+3:30 (IRST)
  - Summer (DST): UTC+4:30 (IRDT)
- Area code: +98661

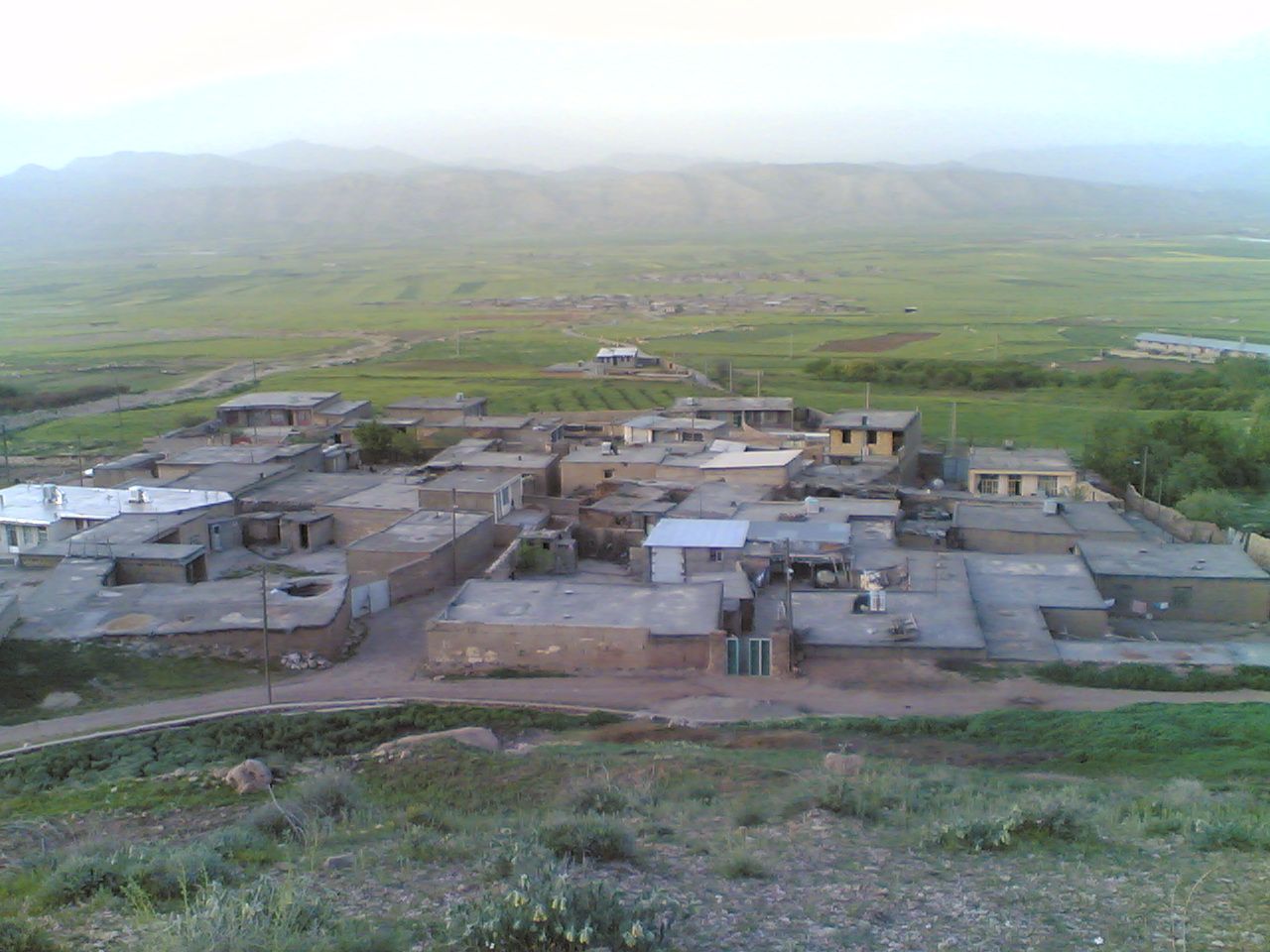

Sorkheh Deh-e Olya (Persian: سرخه ده عليا, also Romanized as Sorkheh Deh-e ‘Olyā; also known as Sorkheh Dar, and sersero) is a village in Koregah-e Sharqi Rural District, in the Central District of Khorramabad County, Lorestan Province, Iran. At the 2006 census, its population was 201, in 33 families.
