= Dastjerd Rural District (Qom County) =

Rural district in Qom province, Iran

Dastjerd Rural District Persian: دهستان دستجرد
- Rural District
- Location within Iran
- Coordinates: 34°33′N 50°16′E
- Country: Iran
- Province: Qom
- County: Qom
- District: Khalajestan
- Established: 1987
- Capital: Dastjerd

Population (2016)
  - Total: 2,782
- Time zone: UTC+3:30 (IRST)

Dastjerd Rural District (Persian: دهستان دستجرد) is in Khalajestan District of Qom County, Qom province, Iran. It is administered from the city of Dastjerd.

== Demographics ==
=== Population ===
At the time of the 2006 National Census, the rural district's population was 4,153 in 1,411 households. There were 3,600 inhabitants in 1,344 households at the following census of 2011. The 2016 census measured the population of the rural district as 2,782 in 1,158 households. The most populous of its 28 villages was Nayeh, with 394 people.

=== Other villages in the rural district ===
- Fujerd
- Giv
- Mujan
- Varzaneh
- Veshareh
- Zizgan
