= Qahan Rural District =

Rural district in Qom province, Iran

Qahan Rural District Persian: دهستان قاهان
- Rural District
- Location within Iran
- Coordinates: 34°45′N 50°16′E
- Country: Iran
- Province: Qom
- County: Jafarabad
- District: Qahan
- Established: 1987
- Capital: Qahan

Population (2016)
  - Total: 2,900
- Time zone: UTC+3:30 (IRST)

Qahan Rural District (Persian: دهستان قاهان) is in Qahan District of Jafarabad County, Qom province, Iran. It is administered from the city of Qahan.

== Demographics ==
=== Population ===
At the time of the 2006 National Census, the rural district's population (as a part of Khalajestan District in Qom County) was 4,260 in 1,348 households. There were 3,145 inhabitants in 1,159 households at the following census of 2011. The 2016 census measured the population of the rural district as 2,900 in 1,117 households. The most populous of its 25 villages was Qahan (now a city), with 784 people.

In 2021, the rural district was separated from the county in the establishment of Jafarabad County and transferred to the new Qahan District.

=== Other villages in the rural district ===
- Ab Danak
- Aghelak
- Anjileh
- Banabar
- Chahak
- Gazabad
- Jemezqan
- Kasva
- Mehrzamin
- Nevis
- Sulaqan
