= Qahan District =

District in Qom province, Iran

Qahan District Persian: بخش قاهان
- District
- Location within Iran
- Coordinates: 34°43′N 50°15′E
- Country: Iran
- Province: Qom
- County: Jafarabad
- Established: 2021
- Capital: Qahan
- Time zone: UTC+3:30 (IRST)

Qahan District (Persian: بخش قاهان) is in Jafarabad County, Qom province, Iran. Its capital is the city of Qahan, whose population at the time of the 2016 National Census was 784 in 286 households.

== History ==
In 2021, Jafarabad District (Note: Renamed the Central District of Jafarabad County) and Qahan Rural District were separated from Qom County in the establishment of Jafarabad County, which was divided into two districts of two rural districts each, with Jafariyeh as its capital and only city at the time. The village of Qahan was converted to a city in 2017.

== Demographics ==
=== Administrative divisions ===
Qahan District
Administrative Divisions
Kohandan RD
Qahan RD
Qahan (city) (Note: Became a city after the 2016 census)
RD = Rural District
