= Khalajestan District =

District in Qom province, Iran

Khalajestan District Persian: بخش خلجستان
- District
- Location within Iran
- Coordinates: 34°33′N 50°16′E
- Country: Iran
- Province: Qom
- County: Qom
- Capital: Dastjerd

Population (2016)
  - Total: 7,207
- Time zone: UTC+3:30 (IRST)

Khalajestan District (Persian: بخش خلجستان) (Note: Also translated as Bakhsh-e Khalajistan and Baxš-e Xalajestân) is in Qom County, Qom province, Iran. Its capital is the city of Dastjerd. The district's name is derived from the Khalaj people.

== History ==
In 2021, Qahan Rural District was separated from the district in the establishment of Jafarabad County.

== Demographics ==
=== Population ===
At the time of the 2006 National Census, the district's population was 9,534 in 3,110 households. The following census in 2011 counted 8,079 people in 2,961 households. The 2016 census measured the population of the district as 7,207 inhabitants in 2,792 households.

=== Administrative divisions ===
Khalajestan District Population
Administrative Divisions	2006	2011	2016
Dastjerd RD	4,153	3,600	2,782
Qahan RD (Note: Transferred to Jafarabad County after the 2016 census)	4,260	3,145	2,900
Dastjerd (city)	1,121	1,334	1,525
Total	9,534	8,079	7,207
RD = Rural District
