= Neyzar =

Neyzar (Persian: نيزار) may refer to:

- Neyzar, Kerman
- Neyzar-e Olya, Khuzestan Province
- Neyzar-e Sofla, Khuzestan Province
- Neyzar, Qom
- Neyzar, Mashhad, Razavi Khorasan Province
- Neyzar Rural District, in Qom Province
