= Masudi (disambiguation) =

Masudi or Masoodi may refer to:

- Al-Masudi (c. 896–956), Arab historian, geographer and traveler, Arab historian
- Masudi, Khuzestan, a village in Khuzestan Province, Iran
- Masudi 2, a village in Khuzestan Province, Iran
- Masudi Al Safar, a village in Khuzestan Province, Iran
- Masudi, South Khorasan, a village in South Khorasan Province, Iran

== See also ==
- Messaoudi
