= Darisiyeh =

Darisiyeh (Persian: دريسيه), also rendered as Dirsiyeh, Dariseh, Darsiyeh, Deriseh, or Drisiyeh, may refer to:

- Darisiyeh, Iran, a merger of the villages below
  - Darisiyeh-ye Olya
  - Darisiyeh-ye Sofla
  - Darisiyeh-ye Vosta
- Darisiyeh Rural District, an administrative division of Shadegan County, Khuzestan province, Iran
