= Masiniyeh =

Masiniyeh or Moseyniyeh (Persian: مثينيه) may refer to:

- Masiniyeh-ye Olya
- Masiniyeh-ye Sofla

== See also ==
- Mohseniyeh
