= Lahemir =

Lahemir لحمير
- Village
- Location within Iran
- Coordinates: 30°55′39″N 49°17′57″E
- Country: Iran
- Province: Khuzestan
- County: Ramshir
- Bakhsh: Central
- Rural District: Abdoliyeh-ye Sharqi

Population (2006)
  - Total: 32
- Time zone: UTC+3:30 (IRST)
  - Summer (DST): UTC+4:30 (IRDT)

Lahemir (Persian: لحمير, also Romanized as Laḩemīr; also known as Laḩemer, Aḩaymer, Aḩīmer, Laḩeymer, Laḩīmer, Laḩīmer-e Shomālī, Laḩmīr-e Tā‘īn, and Oḩaymer) is a village in Abdoliyeh-ye Sharqi Rural District, in the Central District of Ramshir County, Khuzestan Province, Iran. At the 2006 census, its population was 32, in 6 families.
