= Abd Bayan =

Abd Bayan ابدبيان
- Village
- Location within Iran
- Coordinates: 30°49′42″N 49°22′16″E
- Country: Iran
- Province: Khuzestan
- County: Ramshir
- Bakhsh: Central
- Rural District: Abdoliyeh-ye Gharbi

Population (2006)
  - Total: 241
- Time zone: UTC+3:30 (IRST)
  - Summer (DST): UTC+4:30 (IRDT)

Abd Bayan (Persian: ابدبيان, romanized: Ābd Bayān; also known as ‘Abūd Bayān-e Jadīd) is a village in Abdoliyeh-ye Gharbi Rural District, in the Central District of Ramshir County, Khuzestan Province, Iran. At the 2006 census, its population was 241, in 42 families.
