= Motbeg (disambiguation) =

Motbeg is a village in Ramshir County, Khuzestan Province, Iran.

Motbeg or Motbag or Matbag (Persian: مطبگ), also rendered as Motbak or Motbek or Modbag or Modbeg or Modig or Motlebek, may also refer to:

- Motbeg-e Olya, a village in Ramshir County, Khuzestan Province, Iran
- Motbeg-e Sofla, a village in Ramshir County, Khuzestan Province, Iran
- Motbeg-e Vosta, a village in Ramshir County, Khuzestan Province, Iran
