= Abu Yeleyel =

Abu Yeleyel ابويليل
- Village
- Location within Iran
- Coordinates: 30°45′31″N 49°23′29″E
- Country: Iran
- Province: Khuzestan
- County: Ramshir
- Bakhsh: Central
- Rural District: Abdoliyeh-ye Gharbi

Population (2006)
  - Total: 212
- Time zone: UTC+3:30 (IRST)
  - Summer (DST): UTC+4:30 (IRDT)

Abu Yeleyel (Persian: ابويليل, romanized: Abū Yeleyel, Abū Yelayyel, and Abū Yelyel) is a village in Abdoliyeh-ye Gharbi Rural District, in the Central District of Ramshir County, Khuzestan Province, Iran. At the 2006 census, its population was 212, in 45 families.
