= Add-e Sovadi =

Add-e Sovadi عدسوادي
- Village
- Location within Iran
- Coordinates: 30°48′24″N 49°25′57″E
- Country: Iran
- Province: Khuzestan
- County: Ramshir
- Bakhsh: Central
- Rural District: Abdoliyeh-ye Gharbi

Population (2006)
  - Total: 274
- Time zone: UTC+3:30 (IRST)
  - Summer (DST): UTC+4:30 (IRDT)

Add-e Sovadi (Persian: عدسوادي, romanized: ‘Add-e Sovādī, ‘Add-e Savādī, ‘Ad-e Savādī, and ‘Edd-e Sovādī; also known as ‘Ad-e Savāri) is a village in Abdoliyeh-ye Gharbi Rural District, in the Central District of Ramshir County, Khuzestan Province, Iran. At the 2006 census, its population was 274, in 41 families.
