= Qaleh Sharhan =

Qaleh Sharhan قلعه شرهان
- Village
- Location within Iran
- Coordinates: 30°46′48″N 49°28′27″E
- Country: Iran
- Province: Khuzestan
- County: Ramshir
- Bakhsh: Central
- Rural District: Abdoliyeh-ye Gharbi

Population (2006)
  - Total: 56
- Time zone: UTC+3:30 (IRST)
  - Summer (DST): UTC+4:30 (IRDT)

Qaleh Sharhan (Persian: قلعه شرهان, also Romanized as Qal‘eh Sharḩān; also known as Qal‘eh Sharḩāl) is a village in Abdoliyeh-ye Gharbi Rural District, in the Central District of Ramshir County, Khuzestan Province, Iran. At the 2006 census, its population was 56, in 9 families.
