= Cham-e Sobbi =

Cham-e Sobbi چم صبي
- Village
- Location within Iran
- Coordinates: 30°59′21″N 49°26′10″E
- Country: Iran
- Province: Khuzestan
- County: Ramshir
- Bakhsh: Central
- Rural District: Abdoliyeh-ye Sharqi

Population (2006)
  - Total: 292
- Time zone: UTC+3:30 (IRST)
  - Summer (DST): UTC+4:30 (IRDT)

Cham-e Sobbi (Persian: چم صبي, also Romanized as Cham-e Şobbī and Cham Şabī) is a village in Abdoliyeh-ye Sharqi Rural District, in the Central District of Ramshir County, Khuzestan Province, Iran. At the 2006 census, its population was 292, in 61 families.
