= Abu Tavayoj =

Abu Tavayoj ابوتويج
- Village
- Location within Iran
- Coordinates: 30°55′41″N 49°24′36″E
- Country: Iran
- Province: Khuzestan
- County: Ramshir
- Bakhsh: Central
- Rural District: Abdoliyeh-ye Sharqi

Population (2006)
  - Total: 136
- Time zone: UTC+3:30 (IRST)
  - Summer (DST): UTC+4:30 (IRDT)

Abu Tavayoj (Persian: ابوتويج, also Romanized as Abū Ţavayoj, Abū Ţavīj, Abū Ţovayyej, and Abū Ţoveyj) is a village in Abdoliyeh-ye Sharqi Rural District, in the Central District of Ramshir County, Khuzestan Province, Iran. At the 2006 census, its population was 136, in 22 families.
