= Zanat =

Zanat زنات
- Village
- Location within Iran
- Coordinates: 30°48′07″N 49°20′00″E
- Country: Iran
- Province: Khuzestan
- County: Ramshir
- Bakhsh: Central
- Rural District: Abdoliyeh-ye Sharqi

Population (2006)
  - Total: 15
- Time zone: UTC+3:30 (IRST)
  - Summer (DST): UTC+4:30 (IRDT)

Zanat (Persian: زنات, also Romanized as Zanāt; also known as Belādarzī, Belād-e Rāẕī, and Belāderzī) is a village in Abdoliyeh-ye Sharqi Rural District, in the Central District of Ramshir County, Khuzestan Province, Iran. At the 2006 census, its population was 15, in 4 families.
