= Khaziriat =

Khaziriat خضيريات
- Village
- Location within Iran
- Coordinates: 30°45′04″N 49°20′59″E
- Country: Iran
- Province: Khuzestan
- County: Ramshir
- Bakhsh: Central
- Rural District: Abdoliyeh-ye Gharbi

Population (2006)
  - Total: 44
- Time zone: UTC+3:30 (IRST)
  - Summer (DST): UTC+4:30 (IRDT)

Khaziriat (Persian: خضيريات, also Romanized as Khaẕīrīāt, Khazīrīāt, and Khazīrīyāt; also known as Khadairāth, Khafīrīyāt, Khazarīāt, Khaẕrīāt, Kheẕerīāt, Khezeryāt, and Khezīrīyāt) is a village in Abdoliyeh-ye Gharbi Rural District, in the Central District of Ramshir County, Khuzestan Province, Iran. At the 2006 census, its population was 44, in 7 families.
