= Botliyeh =

Botliyeh بطليه
- Village
- Location within Iran
- Coordinates: 30°48′31″N 49°20′18″E
- Country: Iran
- Province: Khuzestan
- County: Ramshir
- Bakhsh: Central
- Rural District: Abdoliyeh-ye Gharbi

Population (2006)
  - Total: 280
- Time zone: UTC+3:30 (IRST)
  - Summer (DST): UTC+4:30 (IRDT)

Botliyeh (Persian: بطليه, romanized: Boţlīyeh and Botleyeh; also known as Bolīyeh and Botlia) is a village in Abdoliyeh-ye Gharbi Rural District, in the Central District of Ramshir County, Khuzestan Province, Iran. At the 2006 census, its population was 280, in 44 families.
