= Bovirdeh =

Bovirdeh بويرده
- Village
- Location within Iran
- Coordinates: 30°56′28″N 49°20′46″E
- Country: Iran
- Province: Khuzestan
- County: Ramshir
- Bakhsh: Central
- Rural District: Abdoliyeh-ye Sharqi

Population (2006)
  - Total: 59
- Time zone: UTC+3:30 (IRST)
  - Summer (DST): UTC+4:30 (IRDT)

Bovirdeh (Persian: بويرده, also Romanized as Bovīrdeh and Boveyr Deh; also known as Bavāredeh and Bwairda) is a village in Abdoliyeh-ye Sharqi Rural District, in the Central District of Ramshir County, Khuzestan Province, Iran. At the 2006 census, its population was 59, in 12 families.
