= Oseyf =

Oseyf عسيف
- Village
- Location within Iran
- Coordinates: 30°59′06″N 49°18′05″E
- Country: Iran
- Province: Khuzestan
- County: Ramshir
- Bakhsh: Central
- Rural District: Abdoliyeh-ye Sharqi

Population (2006)
  - Total: 167
- Time zone: UTC+3:30 (IRST)
  - Summer (DST): UTC+4:30 (IRDT)

Oseyf (Persian: عسيف, also Romanized as ‘Oseyf; also known as Haşayyef and Ḩaşīf) is a village in Abdoliyeh-ye Sharqi Rural District, in the Central District of Ramshir County, Khuzestan Province, Iran. At the 2006 census, its population was 167, in 23 families.
