= Reyhaneh =

Reyhaneh ريحانه
- Village
- Location within Iran
- Coordinates: 30°47′36″N 49°18′40″E
- Country: Iran
- Province: Khuzestan
- County: Ramshir
- Bakhsh: Central
- Rural District: Abdoliyeh-ye Gharbi

Population (2006)
  - Total: 368
- Time zone: UTC+3:30 (IRST)
  - Summer (DST): UTC+4:30 (IRDT)

Reyhaneh is a Persian female given name meaning the "pleasant scent, aroma, odor". Reyhaneh (Persian: ريحانه, also Romanized as Reyḩāneh; also known as Rehāna, Rehāneh, and Reyḩān) is a village in Abdoliyeh-ye Gharbi Rural District, in the Central District of Ramshir County, Khuzestan Province, Iran. At the 2006 census, its population was 368, in 71 families.
