= Yanzar =

Yanzar (Persian: ينزار) may refer to:

- Yanzar-e Olya
- Yanzar-e Sofla

== See also ==
- Neyzar (disambiguation)
