= Udeh-ye Sofla =

Udeh-ye Sofla عوده سفلي
- Village
- Location within Iran
- Coordinates: 30°43′18″N 49°29′30″E
- Country: Iran
- Province: Khuzestan
- County: Ramshir
- Bakhsh: Central
- Rural District: Abdoliyeh-ye Gharbi

Population (2006)
  - Total: 111
- Time zone: UTC+3:30 (IRST)
  - Summer (DST): UTC+4:30 (IRDT)

Udeh-ye Sofla (Persian: عوده سفلي, also Romanized as ‘Ūdeh-ye Soflá and ‘Owdeh-ye Soflá; also known as ‘Owdeh, ‘Owdeh-ye Pā’īn, and ‘Ūdeh-ye Pā’īn) is a village in Abdoliyeh-ye Gharbi Rural District, in the Central District of Ramshir County, Khuzestan Province, Iran. At the 2006 census, its population was 111, in 21 families.
