= Abd Bayan-e Qadim =

Coordinates: 30°49′18″N 49°20′57″E

Abd Bayan-e Qadim ابدبيان قديم
- Village
- Interactive map of Abd Bayan-e Qadim
- Country: Iran
- Province: Khuzestan
- County: Ramshir
- Bakhsh: Central
- Rural District: Abdoliyeh-ye Gharbi

Population (2006)
  - Total: 41
- Time zone: UTC+3:30 (IRST)
  - Summer (DST): UTC+4:30 (IRDT)

Abd Bayan-e Qadim (Persian: ابدبيان قديم, romanized: Ābd Bayān-e Qadīm) is a village in Abdoliyeh-ye Gharbi Rural District, in the Central District of Ramshir County, Khuzestan Province, Iran. At the 2006 census, its population was 41, in 5 families.
