= Talteliyeh =

Talteliyeh تلتليه
- Village
- Location within Iran
- Coordinates: 30°50′21″N 49°20′25″E
- Country: Iran
- Province: Khuzestan
- County: Ramshir
- Bakhsh: Central
- Rural District: Abdoliyeh-ye Gharbi

Population (2006)
  - Total: 239
- Time zone: UTC+3:30 (IRST)
  - Summer (DST): UTC+4:30 (IRDT)

Talteliyeh (Persian: تلتليه, also Romanized as Taltelīyeh, Tel Telia, and Toltolīyeh; also known as Maehamia) is a village in Abdoliyeh-ye Gharbi Rural District, in the Central District of Ramshir County, Khuzestan Province, Iran. At the 2006 census, its population was 239, in 40 families.
