= Rumiat =

Rumiat روميات
- Village
- Location within Iran
- Coordinates: 30°43′59″N 49°23′27″E
- Country: Iran
- Province: Khuzestan
- County: Ramshir
- Bakhsh: Central
- Rural District: Abdoliyeh-ye Gharbi

Population (2006)
  - Total: 96
- Time zone: UTC+3:30 (IRST)
  - Summer (DST): UTC+4:30 (IRDT)

Rumiat (Persian: روميات, also Romanized as Rūmīāt; also known as Rūmeyeh and Rūmīyeh) is a village in Abdoliyeh-ye Gharbi Rural District, in the Central District of Ramshir County, Khuzestan Province, Iran. At the 2006 census, its population was 96, in 13 families.
