= Ruyzat-e Sofla =

Ruyzat-e Sofla رويضات سفلي
- Village
- Location within Iran
- Coordinates: 30°51′25″N 49°18′37″E
- Country: Iran
- Province: Khuzestan
- County: Ramshir
- Bakhsh: Central
- Rural District: Abdoliyeh-ye Sharqi

Population (2006)
  - Total: 203
- Time zone: UTC+3:30 (IRST)
  - Summer (DST): UTC+4:30 (IRDT)

Ruyzat-e Sofla (Persian: رويضات سفلي, also Romanized as Rūyẕāt-e Soflá; also known as Roveyzāt-e Pā’īn, Roveyẕāt-e Soflá, and Rūyẕāt-e Pā’īn) is a village in Abdoliyeh-ye Sharqi Rural District, in the Central District of Ramshir County, Khuzestan Province, Iran. At the 2006 census, its population was 203, in 33 families.
