= Ad-e Qomeys =

Ad-e Qomeys عدقميس
- Village
- Location within Iran
- Coordinates: 30°46′59″N 49°24′57″E
- Country: Iran
- Province: Khuzestan
- County: Ramshir
- Bakhsh: Central
- Rural District: Abdoliyeh-ye Gharbi

Population (2006)
  - Total: 56
- Time zone: UTC+3:30 (IRST)
  - Summer (DST): UTC+4:30 (IRDT)

Ad-e Qomeys (Persian: عدقميس, romanized: ‘Ad-e Qomeys; also known as ‘Add-e Ghomays, ‘Add-e Ghomey, ‘Add-e Ghomeyes, ‘Ad-e Khomeys, ‘Edd Khomeyes, and ‘Edd Qomeyes) is a village in Abdoliyeh-ye Gharbi Rural District, in the Central District of Ramshir County, Khuzestan Province, Iran. At the 2006 census, its population was 56 in 12 families.
