= Abu ol Folus =

Abu ol Folus ابوالفلوس
- Village
- Location within Iran
- Coordinates: 30°47′18″N 49°26′52″E
- Country: Iran
- Province: Khuzestan
- County: Ramshir
- Bakhsh: Central
- Rural District: Abdoliyeh-ye Gharbi

Population (2006)
  - Total: 63
- Time zone: UTC+3:30 (IRST)
  - Summer (DST): UTC+4:30 (IRDT)

Abu ol Folus (Persian: ابوالفلوس, romanized: Abū ol Folūs; also known as Abowlfūlūs, Abū Folūs, and Abū ol Fūlūs) is a village in Abdoliyeh-ye Gharbi Rural District, in the Central District of Ramshir County, Khuzestan Province, Iran. At the 2006 census, its population was 63, in 9 families.
