= Omm ol Khassa =

Omm ol Khassa or Omm ol Khessa (Persian: ام الخثي), also rendered as Omm ol Khesey, Omm ol Khasha, and Omm Khosi, may refer to:

- Omm ol Khassa-ye Olya
- Omm ol Khassa-ye Sofla
- Omm ol Khassa-ye Vosta
