= Mezlageh-ye Sofla =

Mezlageh-ye Soflá مزلاگه سفلي
- Village
- Location within Iran
- Coordinates: 30°43′52″N 49°19′07″E
- Country: Iran
- Province: Khuzestan
- County: Ramshir
- Bakhsh: Central
- Rural District: Abdoliyeh-ye Gharbi

Population (2006)
  - Total: 26
- Time zone: UTC+3:30 (IRST)
  - Summer (DST): UTC+4:30 (IRDT)

Mezlageh-ye Soflá (Persian: مزلاگه سفلي, also Romanized as Mezlāgeh-ye Soflá; also known as Mazlāgeh, Meslāgeh, Mezlāgeh, Mezlāgeh-ye Pā’īn, and Muzlāgiā) is a village in Abdoliyeh-ye Gharbi Rural District, in the Central District of Ramshir County, Khuzestan Province, Iran. At the 2006 census, its population was 26, in 5 families.
