= Farhudiyeh =

Farhudiyeh فرهوديه
- Village
- Location within Iran
- Coordinates: 30°42′47″N 49°26′25″E
- Country: Iran
- Province: Khuzestan
- County: Ramshir
- Bakhsh: Central
- Rural District: Abdoliyeh-ye Gharbi

Population (2006)
  - Total: 26
- Time zone: UTC+3:30 (IRST)
  - Summer (DST): UTC+4:30 (IRDT)

Farhudiyeh (Persian: فرهوديه, romanized: Farhūdīyeh; also known as Farhūdī) is a village in Abdoliyeh-ye Gharbi Rural District, in the Central District of Ramshir County, Khuzestan Province, Iran. At the 2006 census, its population was 26, in 6 families.
