= Abu Feli =

Abu Feli ابوفيلي
- Village
- Location within Iran
- Coordinates: 30°45′15″N 49°19′49″E
- Country: Iran
- Province: Khuzestan
- County: Ramshir
- Bakhsh: Central
- Rural District: Abdoliyeh-ye Gharbi

Population (2006)
  - Total: 34
- Time zone: UTC+3:30 (IRST)
  - Summer (DST): UTC+4:30 (IRDT)

Abu Feli (Persian: ابوفيلي, romanized: Abū Felī) is a village in Abdoliyeh-ye Gharbi Rural District, in the Central District of Ramshir County, Khuzestan Province, Iran. At the 2006 census, its population was 34, in 6 families.
