= Cham-e Eshag =

Cham-e Eshag چم اسحاگ
- Village
- Location within Iran
- Coordinates: 30°58′16″N 49°24′26″E
- Country: Iran
- Province: Khuzestan
- County: Ramshir
- Bakhsh: Central
- Rural District: Abdoliyeh-ye Sharqi

Population (2006)
  - Total: 257
- Time zone: UTC+3:30 (IRST)
  - Summer (DST): UTC+4:30 (IRDT)

Cham-e Eshag (Persian: چم اسحاگ, also Romanized as Cham-e Esḩāg; also known as Cham-e Esḩāq and Sohāg) is a village in Abdoliyeh-ye Sharqi Rural District, in the Central District of Ramshir County, Khuzestan Province, Iran. In 2006, its population was 257, in 43 families.
