= Bukhameh =

Bukhameh (Persian: بوخامه) may refer to:

- Bukhameh-ye Sofla
- Bukhameh-ye Vosta
