= Omm ol Ghezlan, Ramshir =

Omm ol Ghezlan ام الغزلان
- Village
- Location within Iran
- Coordinates: 30°45′24″N 49°17′16″E
- Country: Iran
- Province: Khuzestan
- County: Ramshir
- Bakhsh: Central
- Rural District: Abdoliyeh-ye Gharbi

Population (2006)
  - Total: 27
- Time zone: UTC+3:30 (IRST)
  - Summer (DST): UTC+4:30 (IRDT)

Omm ol Ghezlan (Persian: ام الغزلان, also Romanized as Omm ol Ghezlān; also known as Āhūvand, Āhvand, Ohmgazlan, Omm-ol Qazlān, and Ommol-qezlān) is a village in Abdoliyeh-ye Gharbi Rural District, in the Central District of Ramshir County, Khuzestan Province, Iran. At the 2006 census, its population was 27, in 6 families.
