= Akseh =

Akseh (Persian: عكسه), also rendered as Achseh, may refer to:

- Akseh-ye Olya
- Akseh-ye Sofla
