= Makineh-ye Khar Farih =

Makineh-ye Khar Farih مكينه خرفريح
- Village
- Country: Iran
- Province: Khuzestan
- County: Ramshir
- Bakhsh: Central
- Rural District: Abdoliyeh-ye Sharqi

Population (2006)
  - Total: 46
- Time zone: UTC+3:30 (IRST)
  - Summer (DST): UTC+4:30 (IRDT)

Makineh-ye Khar Farih (Persian: مكينه خرفريح, also Romanized as Makīneh-ye Khar Farīḥ) is a village in Abdoliyeh-ye Sharqi Rural District, in the Central District of Ramshir County, Khuzestan Province, Iran. At the 2006 census, its population was 46, in 6 families.
