= Darisiyeh-ye Olya =

Neighborhood in Khuzestan province, Iran

Darisiyeh-ye Olya Persian: دريسيه عليا
- Neighborhood
- Location within Iran
- Coordinates: 30°55′32″N 48°22′15″E
- Country: Iran
- Province: Khuzestan
- County: Shadegan
- District: Darkhoveyn
- Rural District: Darisiyeh
- Village: Darisiyeh

Population (2011)
  - Total: 600
- Time zone: UTC+3:30 (IRST)

Darisiyeh-ye Olya (Persian: دريسيه عليا) (Note: Also romanized as Darīsīyeh-ye ‘Olyā; also known as Darīseh, Darīsīyeh, Darsīyeh, Derīseh, Dīrsīyeh, and Drīsīyeh) is a neighborhood in the village of Darisiyeh in Darisiyeh Rural District of Darkhoveyn District, Shadegan County, Khuzestan province, Iran.

== Demographics ==
=== Population ===
At the time of the 2006 National Census, its population was 596 in 86 households, when it was a village in Darkhoveyn Rural District of the Central District. The following census in 2011 counted 600 people in 117 households.

In 2012, the rural district was separated from the district in the formation of Darkhoveyn District, and the village was transferred to Darisiyeh Rural District created in the new district. Darisiyeh-ye Sofla merged with Darisiyeh-ye Olya and Darisiyeh-ye Vosta to form the new village of Darisiyeh.
