= Sab-e Agotay-e Olya =

Sab-e Agotay-e Olya سبع اگتاي عليا
- Village
- Location within Iran
- Coordinates: 30°58′02″N 49°22′54″E
- Country: Iran
- Province: Khuzestan
- County: Ramshir
- Bakhsh: Central
- Rural District: Abdoliyeh-ye Sharqi

Population (2006)
  - Total: 263
- Time zone: UTC+3:30 (IRST)
  - Summer (DST): UTC+4:30 (IRDT)

Sab-e Agotay-e Olya (Persian: سبع اگتاي عليا, also Romanized as Sab‘-e Āgotāy-e ‘Olyā; also known as Sab‘-e Gatā‘, Sab‘-e Gatā-e ‘Olyā, Sab‘-e Goţā‘-e Bālā, Sab‘-e Goţā‘-e ‘Olyā, and Soba‘ Geţā‘) is a village in Abdoliyeh-ye Sharqi Rural District, in the Central District of Ramshir County, Khuzestan Province, Iran. At the 2006 census, its population was 263, in 44 families.
