= Sadreh-ye Soveylat =

Sadreh-ye Soveylat سدره صويلات
- Village
- Location within Iran
- Coordinates: 30°49′00″N 49°22′31″E
- Country: Iran
- Province: Khuzestan
- County: Ramshir
- Bakhsh: Central
- Rural District: Abdoliyeh-ye Gharbi

Population (2006)
  - Total: 392
- Time zone: UTC+3:30 (IRST)
  - Summer (DST): UTC+4:30 (IRDT)

Sadreh-ye Soveylat (Persian: سدره صويلات, also Romanized as Şadreh-ye Soveylāt; also known as Sedrah and Sedreh) is a village in Abdoliyeh-ye Gharbi Rural District, in the Central District of Ramshir County, Khuzestan Province, Iran. At the 2006 census, its population was 392, in 64 families.
