= Sab-e Agotay =

Sab-e Agotay (Persian: سبع اگتاي), also rendered as Sab-e Gota or Soba Geta or Sab-e Gata, may refer to:

- Sab-e Agotay-e Olya
- Sab-e Agotay-e Sofla
