= Khar Farih-e Olya =

Khar Farih-e Olya خرفريح عليا
- Village
- Location within Iran
- Coordinates: 30°54′06″N 49°20′45″E
- Country: Iran
- Province: Khuzestan
- County: Ramshir
- Bakhsh: Central
- Rural District: Abdoliyeh-ye Sharqi

Population (2006)
  - Total: 137
- Time zone: UTC+3:30 (IRST)
  - Summer (DST): UTC+4:30 (IRDT)

Khar Farih-e Olya (Persian: خرفريح عليا, also Romanized as Khar Farīḩ-e ’Olya; also known as Ḩar Farīḩ-e ‘Olyā, Kharfareh-ye ’Olya, Kharfereh, Kharfereh-ye Bālā, Kharfereh-ye Dovvom, Kher Fereḩ-e Bālā, and Khorofray) is a village in Abdoliyeh-ye Sharqi Rural District, in the Central District of Ramshir County, Khuzestan Province, Iran. At the 2006 census, its population was 137, in 24 families.
