= Masiniyeh-ye Olya =

Masiniyeh-ye Olya مثينيه عليا
- Village
- Location within Iran
- Coordinates: 30°45′18″N 49°24′52″E
- Country: Iran
- Province: Khuzestan
- County: Ramshir
- Bakhsh: Central
- Rural District: Abdoliyeh-ye Gharbi

Population (2006)
  - Total: 115
- Time zone: UTC+3:30 (IRST)
  - Summer (DST): UTC+4:30 (IRDT)

Masiniyeh-ye Olya (Persian: مثينيه عليا, also Romanized as Masīnīyeh-ye ‘Olyā and Moseynīyeh-ye ‘Olyā) is a village in Abdoliyeh-ye Gharbi Rural District, in the Central District of Ramshir County, Khuzestan Province, Iran. At the 2006 census, its population was 115, in 20 families.
