= Motbeg =

Motbeg مطبگ
- Village
- Location within Iran
- Coordinates: 30°50′23″N 49°26′28″E
- Country: Iran
- Province: Khuzestan
- County: Ramshir
- Bakhsh: Central
- Rural District: Abdoliyeh-ye Gharbi

Population (2006)
  - Total: 260
- Time zone: UTC+3:30 (IRST)
  - Summer (DST): UTC+4:30 (IRDT)

Motbeg (Persian: مطبگ, also Romanized as Moṭbeg; also known as Modbeg-e Ḩaqīqat) is a village in Abdoliyeh-ye Gharbi Rural District, in the Central District of Ramshir County, Khuzestan Province, Iran. At the 2006 census, its population was 260, in 46 families.
