= Belad Motaleb-e Olya =

Belad Motaleb-e Olya بلادمطلب عليا
- Village
- Location within Iran
- Coordinates: 30°54′46″N 49°23′12″E
- Country: Iran
- Province: Khuzestan
- County: Ramshir
- Bakhsh: Central
- Rural District: Abdoliyeh-ye Sharqi

Population (2006)
  - Total: 84
- Time zone: UTC+3:30 (IRST)
  - Summer (DST): UTC+4:30 (IRDT)

Belad Motaleb-e Olya (Persian: بلادمطلب عليا, also Romanized as Belād Moţaleb-e ‘Olyā; also known as Belād Moţlab-e Bālā and Belād Moţlab-e Seyyed Fākher) is a village in Abdoliyeh-ye Sharqi Rural District, in the Central District of Ramshir County, Khuzestan Province, Iran. At the 2006 census, its population was 84, in 13 families.
