= Motbeg-e Olya =

Motbeg-e Olya مطبگ عليا
- Village
- Location within Iran
- Coordinates: 30°50′58″N 49°27′15″E
- Country: Iran
- Province: Khuzestan
- County: Ramshir
- Bakhsh: Central
- Rural District: Abdoliyeh-ye Gharbi

Population (2006)
  - Total: 47
- Time zone: UTC+3:30 (IRST)
  - Summer (DST): UTC+4:30 (IRDT)

Motbeg-e Olya (Persian: مطبگ عليا, also Romanized as Moţbeg-e ‘Olyá; also known as Modbag-e ‘Olyá, Modbeg-e ‘Olyā, Modīg-e Bālā, Motbag Olya, Motbak, Motbak-e ‘Olyā, Moţbek-e Chāseb, and Moţlebek-e Bālā) is a village in Abdoliyeh-ye Gharbi Rural District, in the Central District of Ramshir County, Khuzestan Province, Iran. At the 2006 census, its population was 47, in 7 families.
