= Batuli =

Batuli may refer to:

- Batuli, Ramshir, Iran
- Batuli, Punjab, India
