= Vostaniyeh =

Vostaniyeh (Persian: وسطانيه) may refer to:

- Vostaniyeh 1
- Vostaniyeh 2
