= Cheshmeh Ala =

Cheshmeh Ala (Persian: چِشمِه عَلا) may refer to:

- Cheshmeh A‘la
- Cheshmeh Ali, Qom
