= Belad Motaleb =

Belad Motaleb or Balad Matlab or Belad Motlab or Belad-e Motalleb (Persian: بلادمطلب), also rendered as Badmutlab, may refer to:

- Belad Motaleb-e Olya
- Belad Motaleb-e Sofla
