= Agleh Zovihed =

Village in Khuzestan province, Iran

Agleh Zovihed Persian: عگله زويهد
- Village
- Location within Iran
- Coordinates: 30°59′17″N 49°22′27″E
- Country: Iran
- Province: Khuzestan
- County: Ramshir
- District: Central
- Rural District: Abdoliyeh-ye Gharbi

Population (2016)
  - Total: 721
- Time zone: UTC+3:30 (IRST)

Agleh Zovihed (Persian: عگله زويهد) (Note: Also romanized as ‘Agleh Zovīhed; also known as Algeh Zahad, ‘Eglah Zūyhed-e Pā’īn, Ogleh, Owgleh, Zoḩrīhed ‘Agleh, and Zoḩrīheh-ye ‘Agleh) is a village in Abdoliyeh-ye Gharbi Rural District of the Central District of Ramshir County, Khuzestan province, Iran.

== Demographics ==
=== Population ===
At the time of the 2006 National Census, the village's population was 495 people living in 90 households. The following census in 2011 counted 673 people in 157 households. The 2016 census measured the population of the village as 721 people in 178 households. It was the most populous village in its rural district.
