= Shakht ol Khan =

Neighborhood in Khuzestan province, Iran

Shakht ol Khan Persian: شاخت الخان
- Neighborhood
- Location within Iran
- Coordinates: 30°44′25″N 48°26′20″E
- Country: Iran
- Province: Khuzestan
- County: Shadegan
- District: Darkhoveyn
- City: Darkhoveyn

Population (2006)
  - Total: 1,203
- Time zone: UTC+3:30 (IRST)

Shakht ol Khan (Persian: شاخت الخان) (Note: Also romanized as Shakhtal Khan and Shākhtāl Khān) is a neighborhood in the city of Darkhoveyn in Darkhoveyn District of Shadegan County, Khuzestan province, Iran.

== Demographics ==
=== Population ===
At the time of the 2006 National Census, Shakht ol Khan's population was 1,203 in 214 households, when it was a village in Darkhoveyn Rural District of the Central District.

In 2007, the village of Darkhoveyn merged with the villages of Shakht ol Khan and Yukhan to form the new city of Darkhoveyn. The city was separated from the district in the formation of Darkhoveyn District in 2012.
