= Omm ol Khassa-ye Olya =

Omm ol Khassa-ye Olya ام الخثي عليا
- Village
- Location within Iran
- Coordinates: 30°45′09″N 49°27′57″E
- Country: Iran
- Province: Khuzestan
- County: Ramshir
- Bakhsh: Central
- Rural District: Abdoliyeh-ye Gharbi

Population (2006)
  - Total: 26
- Time zone: UTC+3:30 (IRST)
  - Summer (DST): UTC+4:30 (IRDT)

Omm ol Khassa-ye Olya (Persian: ام الخثي عليا, also Romanized as Omm ol Khas̄s̄á-ye ‘Olyā; also known as Omm Khos̄ī-ye ‘Olyā, Omm ol Khes̄ey, Omm ol Khes̄ey-ye Do, Omm ol Khes̄ey-ye ‘Olyā, and Omm oţ Ţarfeh-ye Bālā) is a village in Abdoliyeh-ye Gharbi Rural District, in the Central District of Ramshir County, Khuzestan Province, Iran. At the 2006 census, its population was 26, in 6 families.
