= Masiniyeh-ye Sofla =

Masiniyeh-ye Sofla مثينيه سفلي
- Village
- Location within Iran
- Coordinates: 30°45′08″N 49°24′42″E
- Country: Iran
- Province: Khuzestan
- County: Ramshir
- Bakhsh: Central
- Rural District: Abdoliyeh-ye Gharbi

Population (2006)
  - Total: 120
- Time zone: UTC+3:30 (IRST)
  - Summer (DST): UTC+4:30 (IRDT)

Masiniyeh-ye Sofla (Persian: مثينيه سفلي, also Romanized as Masīnīyeh-ye Soflá and Moseynīyeh-ye Soflá; also known as Masīnīyeh, Mohs̄enīyeh, and Moseynīyeh) is a village in Abdoliyeh-ye Gharbi Rural District, in the Central District of Ramshir County, Khuzestan Province, Iran. At the 2006 census, its population was 120, in 14 families.
