= Tabreh-ye Olya =

Tabreh-ye Olya طبره عليا
- Village
- Location within Iran
- Coordinates: 30°49′35″N 49°29′50″E
- Country: Iran
- Province: Khuzestan
- County: Ramshir
- Bakhsh: Central
- Rural District: Abdoliyeh-ye Gharbi

Population (2006)
  - Total: 74
- Time zone: UTC+3:30 (IRST)
  - Summer (DST): UTC+4:30 (IRDT)

Tabreh-ye Olya (Persian: طبره عليا, also Romanized as Ţabreh-ye ‘Olyā and Ţabareh-ye ‘Olyā; also known as Ţabareh, Tabra, Ţabreh-ye Bālā,Ţabrīyeh-ye Bālā, and Tāpreh) is a village in Abdoliyeh-ye Gharbi Rural District, in the Central District of Ramshir County, Khuzestan Province, Iran. At the 2006 census, its population was 74, in 10 families.
