= Darisiyeh-ye Vosta =

Neighborhood in Khuzestan province, Iran

Darisiyeh-ye Vosta Persian: دريسيه وسطي
- Neighborhood
- Location within Iran
- Coordinates: 30°55′52″N 48°22′45″E
- Country: Iran
- Province: Khuzestan
- County: Shadegan
- District: Darkhoveyn
- Rural District: Darisiyeh
- Village: Darisiyeh

Population (2011)
  - Total: 699
- Time zone: UTC+3:30 (IRST)

Darisiyeh-ye Vosta (Persian: دريسيه وسطي) (Note: Also romanized as Darīsīyeh-e Vosţá; also known as Dirsiyeh) is a neighborhood in the village of Darisiyeh in Darisiyeh Rural District of Darkhoveyn District, Shadegan County, Khuzestan province, Iran.

== Demographics ==
=== Population ===
At the time of the 2006 National Census, its population was 851 in 152 households, when it was a village in Darkhoveyn Rural District of the Central District. The following census in 2011 counted 699 people in 134 households.

In 2012, the rural district was separated from the district in the formation of Darkhoveyn District, and the village was transferred to Darisiyeh Rural District created in the new district. Darisiyeh-ye Sofla merged with Darisiyeh-ye Olya and Darisiyeh-ye Vosta to form the new village of Darisiyeh.
