= Meshelsheh-ye Olya =

Meshelsheh-ye Olya مشلشه عليا
- Village
- Location within Iran
- Coordinates: 30°52′01″N 49°25′38″E
- Country: Iran
- Province: Khuzestan
- County: Ramshir
- Bakhsh: Central
- Rural District: Abdoliyeh-ye Gharbi

Population (2006)
  - Total: 49
- Time zone: UTC+3:30 (IRST)
  - Summer (DST): UTC+4:30 (IRDT)

Meshelsheh-ye Olya (Persian: مشلشه عليا, also Romanized as Meshelsheh-ye ‘Olyā; also known as Mesheylshīyeh-ye ‘Olyā) is a village in Abdoliyeh-ye Gharbi Rural District, in the Central District of Ramshir County, Khuzestan Province, Iran. At the 2006 census, its population was 49, in 10 families.
