= Sadreh =

Sadreh or Sedrah (Persian: صدره) may refer to:

- Sadreh 1
- Sadreh-ye Soveylat

== See also ==
- Sedreh
