= Omm ol Khassa-ye Sofla =

Omm ol Khassa-ye Sofla ام الخثي سفلي
- Village
- Location within Iran
- Coordinates: 30°44′28″N 49°27′24″E
- Country: Iran
- Province: Khuzestan
- County: Ramshir
- Bakhsh: Central
- Rural District: Abdoliyeh-ye Gharbi

Population (2006)
  - Total: 80
- Time zone: UTC+3:30 (IRST)
  - Summer (DST): UTC+4:30 (IRDT)

Omm ol Khassa-ye Sofla (Persian: ام الخثي سفلي, also Romanized as Omm ol Khas̄s̄á-ye Soflá and Omm ol Khes̄s̄á-ye Soflá; also known as Omm Khos̄ī-ye Pā’īn, Omm Khos̄ī-ye Soflá, Omm ol Khashā Soflá, and Omm ol Khes̄ey-ye Pā’īn) is a village in Abdoliyeh-ye Gharbi Rural District, in the Central District of Ramshir County, Khuzestan Province, Iran. At the 2006 census, its population was 80, in 14 families.
