= Akseh-ye Sofla =

Akseh-ye Sofla عكسه سفلي
- Village
- Location within Iran
- Coordinates: 30°49′59″N 49°19′52″E
- Country: Iran
- Province: Khuzestan
- County: Ramshir
- Bakhsh: Central
- Rural District: Abdoliyeh-ye Sharqi

Population (2006)
  - Total: 31
- Time zone: UTC+3:30 (IRST)
  - Summer (DST): UTC+4:30 (IRDT)

Akseh-ye Sofla (Persian: عكسه سفلي, also Romanized as ‘Akseh-ye Soflá; also known as Āchseh-ye Pā’īn) is a village in Abdoliyeh-ye Sharqi Rural District, in the Central District of Ramshir County, Khuzestan Province, Iran. At the 2006 census, its population was 31, in 4 families.
