= Ramlem =

Ramlem (Persian: رملم) may refer to:

- Ramlem-ye Olya
- Ramlem-ye Sofla
