= Omm ol Khassa-ye Vosta =

Village in Khuzestan, Iran

Omm ol Khassa-ye Vosta ام الخثي وسطي
- Village
- Location within Iran
- Coordinates: 30°44′51″N 49°27′32″E
- Country: Iran
- Province: Khuzestan
- County: Ramshir
- Bakhsh: Central
- Rural District: Abdoliyeh-ye Gharbi

Population (2006)
  - Total: 56
- Time zone: UTC+3:30 (IRST)
  - Summer (DST): UTC+4:30 (IRDT)

Omm ol Khassa-ye Vosta (Persian: ام الخثي وسطي, also Romanized as Omm ol Khas̄s̄á-ye Vostá and Omm ol Khes̄s̄á-ye Vostá; also known as Omm Khos̄ī, Omm Khos̄ī-ye Vosţá, Omm Khos̄nī, Omm ol Khashá Vosţa, Omm ol Khashā-ye Vosţa, and Omm ol Khes̄ey-ye Mīānī) is a village in Abdoliyeh-ye Gharbi Rural District, in the Central District of Ramshir County, Khuzestan Province, Iran. At the 2006 census, its population was 56, in 10 families.
