= Belad Motaleb-e Sofla =

Belad Motaleb-e Sofla بلادمطلب سفلي
- Village
- Location within Iran
- Coordinates: 30°54′00″N 49°21′42″E
- Country: Iran
- Province: Khuzestan
- County: Ramshir
- Bakhsh: Central
- Rural District: Abdoliyeh-ye Sharqi

Population (2006)
  - Total: 107
- Time zone: UTC+3:30 (IRST)
  - Summer (DST): UTC+4:30 (IRDT)

Belad Motaleb-e Sofla (Persian: بلادمطلب سفلي, also Romanized as Belād Moţaleb-e Soflá and Balād Maţlab-e Soflá; also known as Badmutlab, Balād Maţlab-e Pā’īn, Belād-e Moţalleb, and Belād Moţlab-e Seyyed Mosallam) is a village in Abdoliyeh-ye Sharqi Rural District, in the Central District of Ramshir County, Khuzestan Province, Iran. At the 2006 census, its population was 107, in 19 families.
