= Sab-e Agotay-e Sofla =

Sab-e Agotay-e Sofla سبع اگتاي سفلي
- Village
- Location within Iran
- Coordinates: 30°57′01″N 49°22′22″E
- Country: Iran
- Province: Khuzestan
- County: Ramshir
- Bakhsh: Central
- Rural District: Abdoliyeh-ye Sharqi

Population (2006)
  - Total: 117
- Time zone: UTC+3:30 (IRST)
  - Summer (DST): UTC+4:30 (IRDT)

Sab-e Agotay-e Sofla (Persian: سبع اگتاي سفلي, also Romanized as Sab‘-e Āgotāy-e Soflá; also known as Sab‘-e Gatā‘, Sab‘-e Gatā’-e Soflá, Sab‘-e Goţā‘-e Soflá, and Soba‘ Geţā‘) is a village in Abdoliyeh-ye Sharqi Rural District, in the Central District of Ramshir County, Khuzestan Province, Iran. At the 2006 census, its population was 117, in 25 families.
