= Akseh-ye Olya =

Akseh-ye Olya عكسه عليا
- Village
- Location within Iran
- Coordinates: 30°50′29″N 49°19′33″E
- Country: Iran
- Province: Khuzestan
- County: Ramshir
- Bakhsh: Central
- Rural District: Abdoliyeh-ye Sharqi

Population (2006)
  - Total: 61
- Time zone: UTC+3:30 (IRST)
  - Summer (DST): UTC+4:30 (IRDT)

Akseh-ye Olya (Persian: عكسه عليا, also Romanized as ‘Akseh-ye ‘Olyā; also known as Āchseh-ye Bālā) is a village in Abdoliyeh-ye Sharqi Rural District, in the Central District of Ramshir County, Khuzestan Province, Iran. At the 2006 census, its population was 61, in 12 families.
