= Meshelsheh-ye Sofla =

Meshelsheh-ye Sofla مشلشه سفلي
- Village
- Location within Iran
- Coordinates: 30°51′37″N 49°23′32″E
- Country: Iran
- Province: Khuzestan
- County: Ramshir
- Bakhsh: Central
- Rural District: Abdoliyeh-ye Gharbi

Population (2006)
  - Total: 266
- Time zone: UTC+3:30 (IRST)
  - Summer (DST): UTC+4:30 (IRDT)

Meshelsheh-ye Sofla (Persian: مشلشه سفلي, also Romanized as Meshelsheh-ye Soflá; also known as Mesheylshīyeh-ye Pā’īn, Mesheylshīyeh-ye Soflá, Mīshelshīyeh-ye Soflá, Mowsher Sheyeh, and Mowsher Shīyeh) is a village in Abdoliyeh-ye Gharbi Rural District, in the Central District of Ramshir County, Khuzestan Province, Iran. At the 2006 census, its population was 266, in 39 families.
