= Motbeg-e Vosta =

Motbeg-e Vosta مطبگ وسطي
- Village
- Location within Iran
- Coordinates: 30°50′55″N 49°26′59″E
- Country: Iran
- Province: Khuzestan
- County: Ramshir
- Bakhsh: Central
- Rural District: Abdoliyeh-ye Gharbi

Population (2006)
  - Total: 65
- Time zone: UTC+3:30 (IRST)
  - Summer (DST): UTC+4:30 (IRDT)

Motbeg-e Vosta (Persian: مطبگ وسطي, also Romanized as Moţbeg-e Vosţá; also known as Modbag-e Vosţá, Modbeg-e Vosţá, Modīg-e Vasaţ, Motbak, Motbak-e Vosţá, Moţbek-e ‘Abd ol ‘Alī, Moţbek-e ‘Akāshī, and Moţlebek-e Vasaţ) is a village in Abdoliyeh-ye Gharbi Rural District, in the Central District of Ramshir County, Khuzestan Province, Iran. At the 2006 census, its population was 65, in 11 families.
