= Omm ol Ghezlan =

Omm ol Ghezlan or Omm ol Ghazlan (Persian: ام الغزلان) may refer to:

- Omm ol Ghezlan, Ramshir
- Omm ol Ghezlan, Shadegan
