= Bukhameh-ye Vosta =

Bukhameh-ye Vosta بوخامه وسطي
- Village
- Location within Iran
- Coordinates: 30°52′36″N 49°20′37″E
- Country: Iran
- Province: Khuzestan
- County: Ramshir
- Bakhsh: Central
- Rural District: Abdoliyeh-ye Gharbi

Population (2006)
  - Total: 54
- Time zone: UTC+3:30 (IRST)
  - Summer (DST): UTC+4:30 (IRDT)

Bukhameh-ye Vosta (Persian: بوخامه وسطي, romanized: Būkhāmeh-ye Vostá) is a village in Abdoliyeh-ye Gharbi Rural District, in the Central District of Ramshir County, Khuzestan Province, Iran. At the 2006 census, its population was 54, in 11 families.
