= Abdoliyeh =

Village in Khuzestan province, Iran

Abdoliyeh Persian: عبدليه
- Village
- Location within Iran
- Coordinates: 30°48′33″N 49°24′46″E
- Country: Iran
- Province: Khuzestan
- County: Ramshir
- District: Central
- Rural District: Abdoliyeh-ye Sharqi

Population (2016)
  - Total: 566
- Time zone: UTC+3:30 (IRST)

Abdoliyeh (Persian: عبدليه) (Note: Also romanized as ‘Abdolīyeh; also known as Abdoliyye, ‘Abdūlīyeh, Azâde, and Āzādeh) is a village in, and the capital of, Abdoliyeh-ye Sharqi Rural District (Note: Formerly Abdoliyeh Rural District) of the Central District of Ramshir County, Khuzestan province, Iran.

== Demographics ==
=== Population ===
At the time of the 2006 National Census, the village's population was 554 in 130 households. The following census in 2011 counted 534 people in 127 households. The 2016 census measured the population of the village as 566 people in 151 households.
