= Meshelsheh =

Meshelsheh or Mesheylshiyeh (Persian: مشلشه) may refer to:

- Meshelsheh-ye Olya
- Meshelsheh-ye Sofla
