= Khar Farih =

Khar Farih (Persian: خرفريح), also rendered as Har Farih, Kharfareh, Kharfereh, Kher Fereh, and Khorofray, may refer to:

- Khar Farih-e Olya
- Makineh-ye Khar Farih
