= Motbeg-e Sofla =

Motbeg-e Sofla مطبگ سفلي
- Village
- Location within Iran
- Coordinates: 30°50′36″N 49°26′34″E
- Country: Iran
- Province: Khuzestan
- County: Ramshir
- Bakhsh: Central
- Rural District: Abdoliyeh-ye Gharbi

Population (2006)
  - Total: 158
- Time zone: UTC+3:30 (IRST)
  - Summer (DST): UTC+4:30 (IRDT)

Motbeg-e Sofla (Persian: مطبگ سفلي, also Romanized as Moţbeg-e Soflá; also known as Matbag Sofla, Modbag-e Soflá, Modbeg-e Soflá, Modig-e Pā’īn, Moţbak, Motbak-e Soflá, Moţbek-e ‘Abdollāh, and Moţlebek-e Pā’īn) is a village in Abdoliyeh-ye Gharbi Rural District, in the Central District of Ramshir County, Khuzestan Province, Iran. At the 2006 census, its population was 158, in 27 families.
