= Sen, Iran =

Village in Khuzestan province, Iran

Sen Persian: سن
- Village
- Location within Iran
- Coordinates: 30°52′46″N 49°22′58″E
- Country: Iran
- Province: Khuzestan
- County: Ramshir
- District: Central
- Rural District: Abdoliyeh-ye Sharqi

Population (2016)
  - Total: 568
- Time zone: UTC+3:30 (IRST)

Sen (Persian: سن) (Note: Also known as Sīn) is a village in Abdoliyeh-ye Sharqi Rural District (Note: Formerly Abdoliyeh Rural District) of the Central District of Ramshir County, Khuzestan province, Iran.

== Demographics ==
=== Population ===
At the time of the 2006 National Census, the village's population was 503 in 81 households. The following census in 2011 counted 562 people in 139 households. The 2016 census measured the population of the village as 568 people in 168 households. It was the most populous village in its rural district.
