= Safheh =

Safheh (Persian: صفحه) may refer to:

- Safheh 2
- Safheh, Ramshir
- Safheh, Shadegan
