= Bukhameh-ye Sofla =

Village in Khuzestan, Iran

Bukhameh-ye Sofla بوخامه سفلي
- Village
- Location within Iran
- Coordinates: 30°51′19″N 49°20′15″E
- Country: Iran
- Province: Khuzestan
- County: Ramshir
- Bakhsh: Central
- Rural District: Abdoliyeh-ye Gharbi

Population (2006)
  - Total: 492
- Time zone: UTC+3:30 (IRST)
  - Summer (DST): UTC+4:30 (IRDT)

Bukhameh-ye Sofla (Persian: بوخامه سفلي, romanized: Būkhāmeh-ye Soflá; also known as Būkhāmeh, Būkhāmeh-ye Pā’īn, Dūbyān, Safhaw, Vakhāmeh, Valkhāmah-e Soflá, Valkhāmeh-ye Pā’īn, Vikhāma, and Volkhāmeh-ye Pā’īn) is a village in Abdoliyeh-ye Gharbi Rural District, in the Central District of Ramshir County, Khuzestan Province, Iran. At the 2006 census, its population was 492, in 74 families.
