= Darisiyeh, Iran =

Village in Khuzestan province, Iran

Darisiyeh Persian: دريسيه
- Village
- Location within Iran
- Coordinates: 30°55′52″N 48°22′45″E
- Country: Iran
- Province: Khuzestan
- County: Shadegan
- District: Darkhoveyn
- Rural District: Darisiyeh
- Established: 2012

Population (2016)
  - Total: 1,888
- Time zone: UTC+3:30 (IRST)

Darisiyeh Persian: دريسيه) (Note: Formerly Darisiyeh-ye Sofla (دريسيه سفلي), also romanized as Darīsīyeh-ye Soflá; also known as Darīseh, Darīsīyeh, Darsīyeh, Derīseh, Dīrsīyeh, and Drīsīyeh) is a village in, and the capital of, Darisiyeh Rural District of Darkhoveyn District, Shadegan County, Khuzestan province, Iran.

== Demographics ==
=== Population ===
At the time of the 2006 National Census, its population (as Darisiyeh-ye Sofla) was 566 in 88 households, when it was in Darkhoveyn Rural District of the Central District. The following census in 2011 counted 758 people in 159 households. The 2016 census measured the population as 1,888 people in 473 households, by which time the rural district had been separated from the district in the formation of Darkhoveyn District. The village was transferred to Darisiyeh Rural District created in the new district, merging with the villages of Darisiyeh-ye Olya and Darisiyeh-ye Vosta to form the village of Darisiyeh. It was the most populous village in its rural district.
