= Kazemi-ye Khalaf =

Kazemi-ye Khalaf كاظمي خلف
- Village
- Location within Iran
- Coordinates: 30°58′58″N 48°22′05″E
- Country: Iran
- Province: Khuzestan
- County: Shadegan
- Bakhsh: Central
- Rural District: Darkhoveyn

Population (2006)
  - Total: 176
- Time zone: UTC+3:30 (IRST)
  - Summer (DST): UTC+4:30 (IRDT)

Kazemi-ye Khalaf (Persian: كاظمي خلف, also Romanized as Kāz̧emī-ye Khalaf; also known as Kāzemī, Kāz̧emī Yek, and Kāz̧emī-ye Yek) is a village in Darkhoveyn Rural District, in the Central District of Shadegan County, Khuzestan Province, Iran. At the 2006 census, its population was 176, in 22 families.
