= Ramla (disambiguation) =

Ramla is a city in Israel.

Ramla or similar names, derived from Ramal or Rimal (الرمل; Arabic for sand), may refer to:

- Ramala, a village in India
- Ramallah, a Palestinian city in the West Bank
- Ramla Bay, bay in Malta
- Ramleh, Iran (disambiguation)
- Ramleh, near Alexandria, Egypt, see Mahatet El Raml
- La Rambla, Barcelona, Catalan name derived from the same linguistic Arab origin
- Remla, a town in Tunisia
- Rimal, a neighborhood of Gaza
