= Omm ol Hejar =

Omm ol Hejar ام الحجار
- Village
- Location within Iran
- Coordinates: 30°50′08″N 48°28′40″E
- Country: Iran
- Province: Khuzestan
- County: Shadegan
- Bakhsh: Central
- Rural District: Darkhoveyn

Population (2006)
  - Total: 665
- Time zone: UTC+3:30 (IRST)
  - Summer (DST): UTC+4:30 (IRDT)

Omm ol Hejar (Persian: ام الحجار, also Romanized as Omm ol Ḩejār; also known as Omm ol Ḩamām, Omm ol Ḩejā, Omm ol Ḩiyār, Omm ol Jabbār, Umm al Haiyar, and Umrul Hayur) is a village in Darkhoveyn Rural District, in the Central District of Shadegan County, Khuzestan Province, Iran. At the 2006 census, its population was 665, in 88 families.
