= Tabra =

Tabra may refer to:

- Tabra, Iran, a village in Khuzestan Province, Iran
- Tăbra River, in Romania
- Saint Tabra, 5th century Christian saint, see Theonistus, Tabra, and Tabratha
