= Ramleh, Iran =

Ramleh (Persian: رمله) may refer to:

- Ramleh, Hormozgan
- Ramleh-ye Olya, Ramshir County, Khuzestan Province, Iran
- Ramleh-ye Sofla, Ramshir County, Khuzestan Province, Iran
