= Modig =

Modig may refer to:

- Modig, Iran (disambiguation), places in Iran
- Aron Modig (born 1985), Swedish politician
- Einar Modig (1883–1960), Swedish diplomat
- Johan Modig (born 1977), Swedish orienteering competitor
- Linda Modig (born 1975), a Swedish politician
- Mattias Modig (born 1987), Swedish ice hockey player
- Silvia Modig (born 1976), a Finnish politician
