= Ramleh-ye Olya =

Ramleh-ye Olya رمله عليا
- Village
- Location within Iran
- Coordinates: 30°44′03″N 49°22′36″E
- Country: Iran
- Province: Khuzestan
- County: Ramshir
- Bakhsh: Central
- Rural District: Abdoliyeh-ye Gharbi

Population (2006)
  - Total: 51
- Time zone: UTC+3:30 (IRST)
  - Summer (DST): UTC+4:30 (IRDT)

Ramleh-ye Olya (Persian: رمله عليا, also Romanized as Ramleh-ye ‘Olyā; also known as Ramleh, Ramleh-ye Bālā, and Ramlem-ye ‘Olyā) is a village in Abdoliyeh-ye Gharbi Rural District, in the Central District of Ramshir County, Khuzestan Province, Iran. At the 2006 census, its population was 51, in 9 families.
