= Salhaviyeh =

Salhaviyeh صلاحاويه
- Village
- Location within Iran
- Coordinates: 30°48′11″N 48°26′22″E
- Country: Iran
- Province: Khuzestan
- County: Shadegan
- Bakhsh: Central
- Rural District: Darkhoveyn

Population (2006)
  - Total: 350
- Time zone: UTC+3:30 (IRST)
  - Summer (DST): UTC+4:30 (IRDT)

Salhaviyeh (Persian: صلاحاويه, also Romanized as Şalḩāveyeh and Salhavīyeh; also known as Şalāḩāveyeh-ye Yek, Şalāḩāvīyeh, Şalāḩāvīyeh-ye Yek, Salaihāwīyeh, Şaleh Ḩāvīyeh, and Şalīḩāvīyeh) is a village in Darkhoveyn Rural District, in the Central District of Shadegan County, Khuzestan Province, Iran. At the 2006 census, its population was 350, in 42 families.
