= Segareh =

Segareh سگاره
- Village
- Location within Iran
- Coordinates: 30°51′04″N 48°26′19″E
- Country: Iran
- Province: Khuzestan
- County: Shadegan
- Bakhsh: Central
- Rural District: Darkhoveyn

Population (2006)
  - Total: 161
- Time zone: UTC+3:30 (IRST)
  - Summer (DST): UTC+4:30 (IRDT)

Segareh (Persian: سگاره, also Romanized as Segāreh; also known as Hālūb) is a village in Darkhoveyn Rural District, in the Central District of Shadegan County, Khuzestan Province, Iran. At the 2006 census, its population was 161, in 27 families.
