= Neyzar-e Olya =

Neyzar-e Olya نيزارعليا
- Village
- Location within Iran
- Coordinates: 30°41′01″N 49°18′46″E
- Country: Iran
- Province: Khuzestan
- County: Ramshir
- Bakhsh: Central
- Rural District: Abdoliyeh-ye Gharbi

Population (2006)
  - Total: 35
- Time zone: UTC+3:30 (IRST)
  - Summer (DST): UTC+4:30 (IRDT)

Neyzar-e Olya (Persian: نيزارعليا, also Romanized as Neyzār-e ‘Olyā; also known as Naz̧ār-e Bālā, Nozzār-e Bālā, Nozzār-e ‘Olyā, and Yanzār-e ‘Olyā) is a village in Abdoliyeh-ye Gharbi Rural District, in the Central District of Ramshir County, Khuzestan Province, Iran. At the 2006 census, its population was 35, in 6 families.
