= Makaniyeh-ye Salahaviyeh =

Village in Khuzestan province, Iran

Makaniyeh-ye Salahaviyeh Persian: مكنيه صلاحاويه
- Village
- Location within Iran
- Coordinates: 30°47′09″N 48°27′04″E
- Country: Iran
- Province: Khuzestan
- County: Shadegan
- District: Darkhoveyn
- Rural District: Darkhoveyn

Population (2016)
  - Total: 909
- Time zone: UTC+3:30 (IRST)

Makaniyeh-ye Salahaviyeh (Persian: مكنيه صلاحاويه) (Note: Also romanized as Makanīyeh-ye Salāḥāvīyeh) is a village in Darkhoveyn Rural District of Darkhoveyn District, Shadegan County, Khuzestan province, Iran.

== Demographics ==
=== Population ===
At the time of the 2006 National Census, the village's population was 769 in 100 households, when it was in the Central District. The following census in 2011 counted 803 people in 193 households. The 2016 census measured the population of the village as 909 people in 221 households, by which time the rural district had been separated from the district in the formation of Darkhoveyn District. It was the most populous village in its rural district.
