= Neyzar-e Sofla =

Neyzar-e Sofla نيزارسفلي
- Village
- Location within Iran
- Coordinates: 30°41′03″N 49°19′34″E
- Country: Iran
- Province: Khuzestan
- County: Ramshir
- Bakhsh: Central
- Rural District: Abdoliyeh-ye Gharbi

Population (2006)
  - Total: 69
- Time zone: UTC+3:30 (IRST)
  - Summer (DST): UTC+4:30 (IRDT)

Neyzar-e Sofla (Persian: نيزارسفلي, also Romanized as Neyzār-e Soflá; also known as Nazar, Naz̧ār-e Pā’īn, Neyzār, Nozzār-e Pā’īn, and Yanzār-e Soflá) is a village in Abdoliyeh-ye Gharbi Rural District, in the Central District of Ramshir County, Khuzestan Province, Iran. At the 2006 census, its population was 69, in 12 families.
