= Dabuhiyeh =

Dabuhiyeh دابوهيه
- Village
- Location within Iran
- Coordinates: 30°54′00″N 48°30′50″E
- Country: Iran
- Province: Khuzestan
- County: Shadegan
- Bakhsh: Central
- Rural District: Darkhoveyn

Population (2006)
  - Total: 193
- Time zone: UTC+3:30 (IRST)
  - Summer (DST): UTC+4:30 (IRDT)

Dabuhiyeh (Persian: دابوهيه, also Romanized as Dābūhīyeh; also known as Dābūḩayeh and Dābūḩayeh-ye Jannat) is a village in Darkhoveyn Rural District, in the Central District of Shadegan County, Khuzestan Province, Iran. At the 2006 census, its population was 193, in 33 families.
