= Shakhtal Khan-e Seh =

Shakhtal Khan-e Seh شاخت الخان سه
- Village
- Location within Iran
- Coordinates: 30°48′12″N 48°29′00″E
- Country: Iran
- Province: Khuzestan
- County: Shadegan
- Bakhsh: Central
- Rural District: Darkhoveyn

Population (2006)
  - Total: 192
- Time zone: UTC+3:30 (IRST)
  - Summer (DST): UTC+4:30 (IRDT)

Shakhtal Khan-e Seh (Persian: شاخت الخان سه, also Romanized as Shākhtal Khān-e Seh) is a village in Darkhoveyn Rural District, in the Central District of Shadegan County, Khuzestan Province, Iran. At the 2006 census, its population was 192, in 33 families.
