= Safheh, Ramshir =

Village in Khuzestan province, Iran

Safheh Persian: صفحه
- Village
- Location within Iran
- Coordinates: 30°52′28″N 49°19′59″E
- Country: Iran
- Province: Khuzestan
- County: Ramshir
- District: Central
- Rural District: Abdoliyeh-ye Gharbi

Population (2016)
  - Total: 467
- Time zone: UTC+3:30 (IRST)

Safheh (Persian: صفحه) (Note: Also romanized as Şafḩeh) is a village in, and the capital of, Abdoliyeh-ye Gharbi Rural District of the Central District of Ramshir County, Khuzestan province, Iran.

== Demographics ==
=== Population ===
At the time of the 2006 National Census, the village's population was 429 in 80 households. The following census in 2011 counted 404 people in 88 households. The 2016 census measured the population of the village as 467 people in 113 households.
