= Shakhtal Khan-e Do =

Shakhtal Khan-e Do شاخت الخان دو
- Village
- Location within Iran
- Coordinates: 30°46′39″N 48°27′56″E
- Country: Iran
- Province: Khuzestan
- County: Shadegan
- Bakhsh: Central
- Rural District: Darkhoveyn

Population (2006)
  - Total: 157
- Time zone: UTC+3:30 (IRST)
  - Summer (DST): UTC+4:30 (IRDT)

Shakhtal Khan-e Do (Persian: شاخت الخان دو, also Romanized as Shākhtal Khān-e Do; also known as Shākht) is a village in Darkhoveyn Rural District, in the Central District of Shadegan County, Khuzestan Province, Iran. At the 2006 census, its population was 157, in 29 families.
