= Achreshiyeh-ye Bozorg =

Achreshiyeh-ye Bozorg عچرشيه بزرگ
- Village
- Location within Iran
- Coordinates: 30°53′38″N 48°26′50″E
- Country: Iran
- Province: Khuzestan
- County: Shadegan
- Bakhsh: Central
- Rural District: Darkhoveyn

Population (2006)
  - Total: 84
- Time zone: UTC+3:30 (IRST)
  - Summer (DST): UTC+4:30 (IRDT)

Achreshiyeh-ye Bozorg (Persian: عچرشيه بزرگ, also Romanized as ‘Achreshīyeh-ye Bozorg; also known as ‘Achreshīyeh, Ajershiyeh, and Ajreshīyeh) is a village in Darkhoveyn Rural District, in the Central District of Shadegan County, Khuzestan Province, Iran. At the 2006 census, its population was 84, in 13 families.
