= Ramleh-ye Sofla =

Ramleh-ye Sofla رمله سفلي
- Village
- Location within Iran
- Coordinates: 30°43′02″N 49°23′02″E
- Country: Iran
- Province: Khuzestan
- County: Ramshir
- Bakhsh: Central
- Rural District: Abdoliyeh-ye Gharbi

Population (2006)
  - Total: 70
- Time zone: UTC+3:30 (IRST)
  - Summer (DST): UTC+4:30 (IRDT)

Ramleh-ye Sofla (Persian: رمله سفلي, also Romanized as Ramleh-ye Soflá; also known as Ramleh, Ramleh-ye Pā’īn, Ramlem-ye Pā’īn, and Rumla) is a village in Abdoliyeh-ye Gharbi Rural District, in the Central District of Ramshir County, Khuzestan Province, Iran. At the 2006 census, its population was 70, in 10 families.
