= Masudi-ye Do =

Masudi-ye Do مسعودي دو
- Village
- Location within Iran
- Coordinates: 30°39′51″N 48°19′42″E
- Country: Iran
- Province: Khuzestan
- County: Shadegan
- Bakhsh: Central
- Rural District: Darkhoveyn

Population (2006)
  - Total: 88
- Time zone: UTC+3:30 (IRST)
  - Summer (DST): UTC+4:30 (IRDT)

Masudi-ye Do (Persian: مسعودي دو, also Romanized as Mas‘ūdī-ye Do; also known as Mas‘ūdīyeh-ye Do) is a village in Darkhoveyn Rural District, in the Central District of Shadegan County, Khuzestan Province, Iran. At the 2006 census, its population was 88, in 22 families.
