= Aliabad, Salafchegan =

Village in Qom province, Iran

Aliabad Persian: علي اباد
- Village
- Location within Iran
- Coordinates: 34°17′02″N 50°43′20″E
- Country: Iran
- Province: Qom
- County: Qom
- District: Salafchegan
- Rural District: Neyzar

Population (2016)
  - Total: 281
- Time zone: UTC+3:30 (IRST)

Aliabad (Persian: علی‌آباد) (Note: Also romanized as ‘Alīābād; also known as ‘Alīābād-e Neyzār) is a village in Neyzar Rural District of Salafchegan District in Qom County, Qom province, Iran.

== Demographics ==
=== Population ===
At the time of the 2006 National Census, the village's population was 318 in 82 households. The following census in 2011 counted 302 people in 95 households. The 2016 census measured the population of the village as 281 people in 98 households.
