= Masudi Al Safar =

Masudi Al Safar مسعودي ال صفر
- Village
- Location within Iran
- Coordinates: 30°40′36″N 48°20′25″E
- Country: Iran
- Province: Khuzestan
- County: Shadegan
- Bakhsh: Central
- Rural District: Darkhoveyn

Population (2006)
  - Total: 50
- Time zone: UTC+3:30 (IRST)
  - Summer (DST): UTC+4:30 (IRDT)

Masudi Al Safar (Persian: مسعودي ال صفر, also Romanized as Mas‘ūdī Āl Şafar and Mas‘ūdī-ye Āl-e Şafar; also known as Sa‘ūdī Al Safar) is a village in Darkhoveyn Rural District, in the Central District of Shadegan County, Khuzestan Province, Iran. At the 2006 census, its population was 50, in 9 families.
