= Khadijeh Khatun =

Village in Qom province, Iran

Khadijeh Khatun Persian: خديجه خاتون
- Village
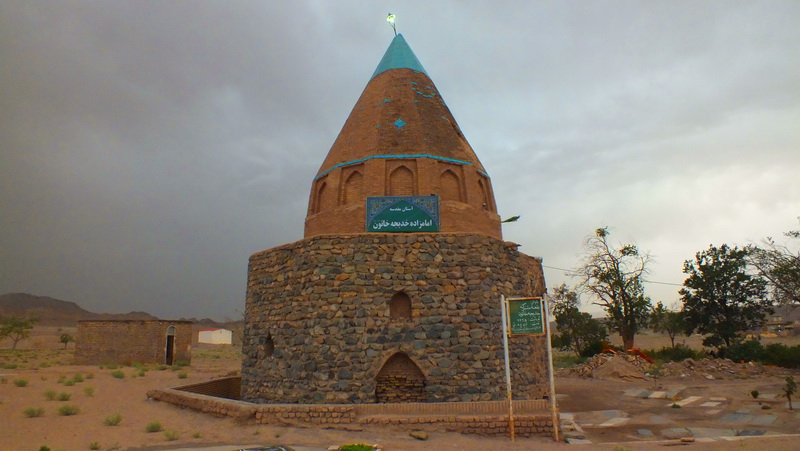
- Shrine in the village of Khadijeh Khatun

- Location within Iran
- Coordinates: 34°28′18″N 50°38′59″E
- Country: Iran
- Province: Qom
- County: Qom
- District: Salafchegan
- Rural District: Neyzar

Population (2016)
  - Total: 647
- Time zone: UTC+3:30 (IRST)

Khadijeh Khatun (Persian: خديجه خاتون) (Note: Also romanized as Khadījeh Khātūn) is a village in Neyzar Rural District of Salafchegan District in Qom County, Qom province, Iran.

== Demographics ==
=== Population ===
At the time of the 2006 National Census, the village's population was 422 in 112 households. The following census in 2011 counted 621 people in 189 households. The 2016 census measured the population of the village as 647 people in 200 households.
