= Qaleh Cham =

Village in Qom province, Iran

Qaleh Cham Persian: قلعه چم
- Village
- Location within Iran
- Coordinates: 34°23′04″N 50°36′25″E
- Country: Iran
- Province: Qom
- County: Qom
- District: Salafchegan
- Rural District: Neyzar

Population (2016)
  - Total: 891
- Time zone: UTC+3:30 (IRST)

Qaleh Cham (Persian: قلعه چم) (Note: Also romanized as Qal‘eh Cham, Qal‘eh-i-Cham, Qal‘eh-ye Cham; also known as Qal‘eh-ye Jam) is a village in Neyzar Rural District of Salafchegan District in Qom County, Qom province, Iran.

== Demographics ==
=== Population ===
At the time of the 2006 National Census, the village's population was 775 in 209 households. The following census in 2011 counted 634 people in 187 households. The 2016 census measured the population of the village as 891 people in 284 households.
