= Safheh, Shadegan =

Safheh صفحه
- Village
- Location within Iran
- Coordinates: 30°56′11″N 48°28′17″E
- Country: Iran
- Province: Khuzestan
- County: Shadegan
- Bakhsh: Central
- Rural District: Darkhoveyn

Population (2006)
  - Total: 168
- Time zone: UTC+3:30 (IRST)
  - Summer (DST): UTC+4:30 (IRDT)

Safheh (Persian: صفحه, also Romanized as Şafḩeh) is a village in Darkhoveyn Rural District, in the Central District of Shadegan County, Khuzestan Province, Iran. At the 2006 census, its population was 168, in 23 families.
