= Tayqan, Qom =

Village in Qom province, Iran

Tayqan Persian: طايقان
- Village
- Location within Iran
- Coordinates: 34°29′22″N 50°41′49″E
- Country: Iran
- Province: Qom
- County: Qom
- District: Salafchegan
- Rural District: Neyzar

Population (2016)
  - Total: 1,194
- Time zone: UTC+3:30 (IRST)

Tayqan (Persian: طايقان) (Note: Also romanized as Ţāyeqān and Tāyqān; also known as Dāghān) is a village in Neyzar Rural District of Salafchegan District in Qom County, Qom province, Iran.

== Demographics ==
=== Population ===
At the time of the 2006 National Census, the village's population was 703 in 189 households. The following census in 2011 counted 845 people in 258 households. The 2016 census measured the population of the village as 1,194 people in 365 households, the most populous in its rural district.
