= Shebeli Tower =

Mausoleum tower and national heritage site in Damavand, Iran

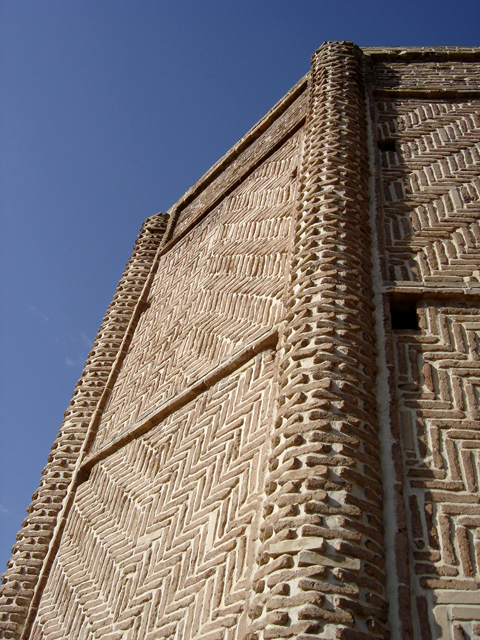
The brickwork recalls Seljuk craftsmanship

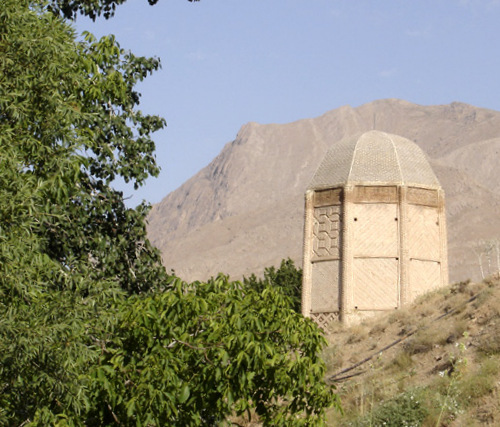
The tomb is located on top of a hill adjacent to Damavand

Shebeli Tower (Persian: برج شیخ شبلی) is a historic tower in Damavand, a city situated in the Tehran province of Iran.

Standing approximately 10 metres (33 ft) tall, the structure is a roofed octagonal monument apparently dedicated to Abu Bakr al-Shibli, a Sufi mystic and governor of Damavand. A sirdāb (basement) also exists under the structure.

The structure is a remnant of the Samanid era, dating it to the 12th century at the latest. Shebeli Tower is similar in design to extant structures in Bukhara.

The structure recently underwent some preservations.

== See also ==
- Abu Bakr al-Shibli
- Iranian architecture
- Tehran province
- Damavand
- Sufism
- Mount Damavand
