= Khalajabad =

Village in Qom province, Iran

Khalajabad Persian: خلج اباد
- Village
- Location within Iran
- Coordinates: 34°28′49″N 50°38′46″E
- Country: Iran
- Province: Qom
- County: Qom
- District: Salafchegan
- Rural District: Neyzar

Population (2016)
  - Total: 394
- Time zone: UTC+3:30 (IRST)

Khalajabad (Persian: خلج اباد) (Note: Also romanized as Khalajābād; also known as Qalīchābād) is a village in Neyzar Rural District of Salafchegan District in Qom County, Qom province, Iran.

== Demographics ==
=== Population ===
At the time of the 2006 National Census, the village's population was 282 in 73 households. The following census in 2011 counted 343 people in 108 households. The 2016 census measured the population of the village as 394 people in 123 households.
