= Messaoudi =

Messaoudi (in Arabic مسعودي) is a surname. Notable people with the name include:

- Ahmed El Messaoudi (born 1995), Moroccan footballer
- Aïssa Messaoudi, Algerian Islamist.
- Ali Messaoudi (born 1995), Algerian steeplechase runner
- Billel Messaoudi (born 1997), Algerian footballer
- Kamel Messaoudi (1961–1998), Algerian Chaabi music performer
- Khalida Messaoudi or Khalida Toumi (born 1958), Algerian politician
- Mehdi Messaoudi (born 1989), French-Moroccan footballer
- Mehdi Messaoudi (wrestler) (born 1990), Moroccan Greco-Roman wrestler.
- Mohamed Messaoudi (born 1973), Tunisian handball player

== See also ==
- Masudi
