= Vostaniyeh-ye Yek =

Vostaniyeh-ye Yek وسطانيه يك
- Village
- Location within Iran
- Coordinates: 30°49′22″N 48°29′31″E
- Country: Iran
- Province: Khuzestan
- County: Shadegan
- Bakhsh: Central
- Rural District: Darkhoveyn

Population (2006)
  - Total: 321
- Time zone: UTC+3:30 (IRST)
  - Summer (DST): UTC+4:30 (IRDT)

Vostaniyeh-ye Yek (Persian: وسطانيه يك, also Romanized as Vostānīyeh-ye Yek) is a village in Darkhoveyn Rural District, in the Central District of Shadegan County, Khuzestan Province, Iran. At the 2006 census, its population was 321, in 46 families.
