= Vostaniyeh-ye Do =

Vostaniyeh-ye Do وسطانيه دو
- Village
- Location within Iran
- Coordinates: 30°48′44″N 48°28′58″E
- Country: Iran
- Province: Khuzestan
- County: Shadegan
- Bakhsh: Central
- Rural District: Darkhoveyn

Population (2006)
  - Total: 294
- Time zone: UTC+3:30 (IRST)
  - Summer (DST): UTC+4:30 (IRDT)

Vostaniyeh-ye Do (Persian: وسطانيه دو, also Romanized as Vostānīyeh-ye Do; also known as Vosţānīyeh) is a village in Darkhoveyn Rural District, in the Central District of Shadegan County, Khuzestan Province, Iran. At the 2006 census, its population was 294, in 55 families.
