= Hajjiabad-e Neyzaz =

Village in Qom province, Iran

Hajjiabad-e Neyzaz Persian: حاجي ابادنيزاز
- Village
- Location within Iran
- Coordinates: 34°16′46″N 50°32′06″E
- Country: Iran
- Province: Qom
- County: Qom
- District: Salafchegan
- Rural District: Neyzar

Population (2016)
  - Total: 156
- Time zone: UTC+3:30 (IRST)

Hajjiabad-e Neyzaz (Persian: حاجي ابادنيزاز) (Note: Also romanized as Ḩājjīābād-e Neyzāz; also known as Ḩājjīābād-e Neyzār, Ḩājīābād, Hājīābād, and Ḩājjīābād) is a village in Neyzar Rural District of Salafchegan District in Qom County, Qom province, Iran.

== Demographics ==
=== Population ===
At the time of the 2006 National Census, the village's population was 153 in 42 households. The following census in 2011 counted 167 people in 42 households. The 2016 census measured the population of the village as 156 people in 44 households.
