= Masudi, Khuzestan =

Masudi مسعودي
- Village
- Location within Iran
- Coordinates: 30°40′36″N 48°20′25″E
- Country: Iran
- Province: Khuzestan
- County: Shadegan
- Bakhsh: Central
- Rural District: Darkhoveyn

Population (2006)
  - Total: 45
- Time zone: UTC+3:30 (IRST)
  - Summer (DST): UTC+4:30 (IRDT)

Masudi (Persian: مسعودي, also Romanized as Mas‘ūdī) is a village in Darkhoveyn Rural District, in the Central District of Shadegan County, Khuzestan Province, Iran. At the 2006 census, its population was 45, in 7 families.
