= Omm ol Ghezlan, Shadegan =

Omm ol Ghezlan ام الغزلان
- Village
- Location within Iran
- Coordinates: 30°50′55″N 48°28′23″E
- Country: Iran
- Province: Khuzestan
- County: Shadegan
- Bakhsh: Central
- Rural District: Darkhoveyn

Population (2006)
  - Total: 872
- Time zone: UTC+3:30 (IRST)
  - Summer (DST): UTC+4:30 (IRDT)

Omm ol Ghezlan (Persian: ام الغزلان, also Romanized as Omm ol Ghezlān and Omm ol Ghazlān) is a village in Darkhoveyn Rural District, in the Central District of Shadegan County, Khuzestan Province, Iran. At the 2006 census, its population was 872 dispersed across 121 families.
