= Cheshmeh Aʽla =

Mineral spring near Damavand, Iran

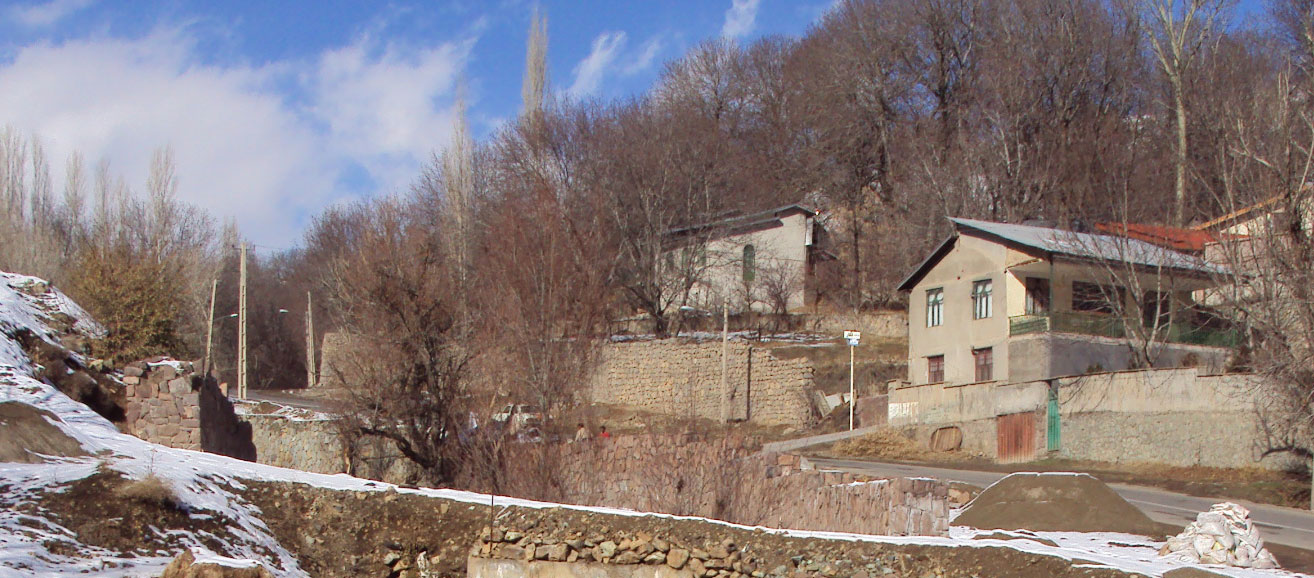
- Interactive map of Cheshmeh Aʽla
- Location: Damavand, Damavand County, Tehran Province, Iran
- Coordinates: 35°45′01″N 52°03′03″E

Cheshmeh Aʽla (Persian: چشمه اعلا) is a mineral spring located about 4 km north of the city of Damavand, Iran.
