= Darkhoveyn =

City in Khuzestan province, Iran

Darkhoveyn Persian: دارخوین
- City
- Location within Iran
- Coordinates: 30°44′42″N 48°25′48″E
- Country: Iran
- Province: Khuzestan
- County: Shadegan
- District: Darkhoveyn
- Established as a municipality: 2007

Population (2016)
  - Total: 5,655
- Time zone: UTC+3:30 (IRST)

Darkhoveyn (Persian: دارخوین) (Note: Also romanized as Dārkhoveyn, Dārkhovīn, Darkhwin, and Dārxoweyn; also known as Dār Khūyeh, Daurat al Qaiwain, Dorquain, and Kūt ol ‘Abīd) is a city in, and the capital of, Darkhoveyn District of Shadegan County, Khuzestan province, Iran. It also serves as the administrative center for Darkhoveyn Rural District. The city is the site of a nuclear facility.

== Demographics ==
=== Population ===
At the time of the 2006 National Census, Darkhoveyn's population was 2,766 in 523 households, when it was a village in Darkhoveyn Rural District of the Central District. The following census in 2011 counted 5,759 people in 1,338 households, by which time the village had merged with the villages of Shakht ol Khan and Yukhan to form the city of Darkhoveyn. The 2016 census measured the population of the city as 5,655 people in 1,458 households, when the city and rural district had been separated from the district in the formation of Darkhoveyn District.
