= Darisiyeh Rural District =

Rural district in Khuzestan province, Iran

Darisiyeh Rural District Persian: دهستان دریسیه
- Rural District
- Location within Iran
- Coordinates: 30°55′N 48°30′E
- Country: Iran
- Province: Khuzestan
- County: Shadegan
- District: Darkhoveyn
- Established: 2012
- Capital: Darisiyeh

Population (2016)
  - Total: 5,037
- Time zone: UTC+3:30 (IRST)

Darisiyeh Rural District (Persian: دهستان دریسیه) is in Darkhoveyn District of Shadegan County, Khuzestan province, Iran. Its capital is the village of Darisiyeh.

== History ==
In 2012, Darkhoveyn Rural District and the city of Darkhoveyn were separated from the Central District in the formation of Darkhoveyn District, and Darisiyeh Rural District was created in the new district.

== Demographics ==
=== Population ===
At the time of the 2016 census, the rural district's population was 5,037 in 1,250 households. The most populous of its 15 villages was Darisiyeh, with 1,888 people.
