= Cheshmeh Ali, Qom =

Village in Qom province, Iran

Cheshmeh Ali Persian: چشمه علي
- Village
- Location within Iran
- Coordinates: 34°22′11″N 50°34′53″E
- Country: Iran
- Province: Qom
- County: Qom
- District: Salafchegan
- Rural District: Neyzar

Population (2016)
  - Total: 199
- Time zone: UTC+3:30 (IRST)

Cheshmeh Ali (Persian: چشمه علي) (Note: Also romanized as Chashmeh ‘Alī, Chashmeh-ye ‘Alī, and Cheshmeh ‘Alī; also known as Cheshmeh ‘Alā) is a village in Neyzar Rural District of Salafchegan District in Qom County, Qom province, Iran.

== Demographics ==
=== Population ===
At the time of the 2006 National Census, the village's population was 203 in 59 households. The following census in 2011 counted 179 people in 55 households. The 2016 census measured the population of the village as 199 people in 61 households.
