= Damavand, Iran =

City in Tehran province, Iran

Damavand Persian: دماوند
- City
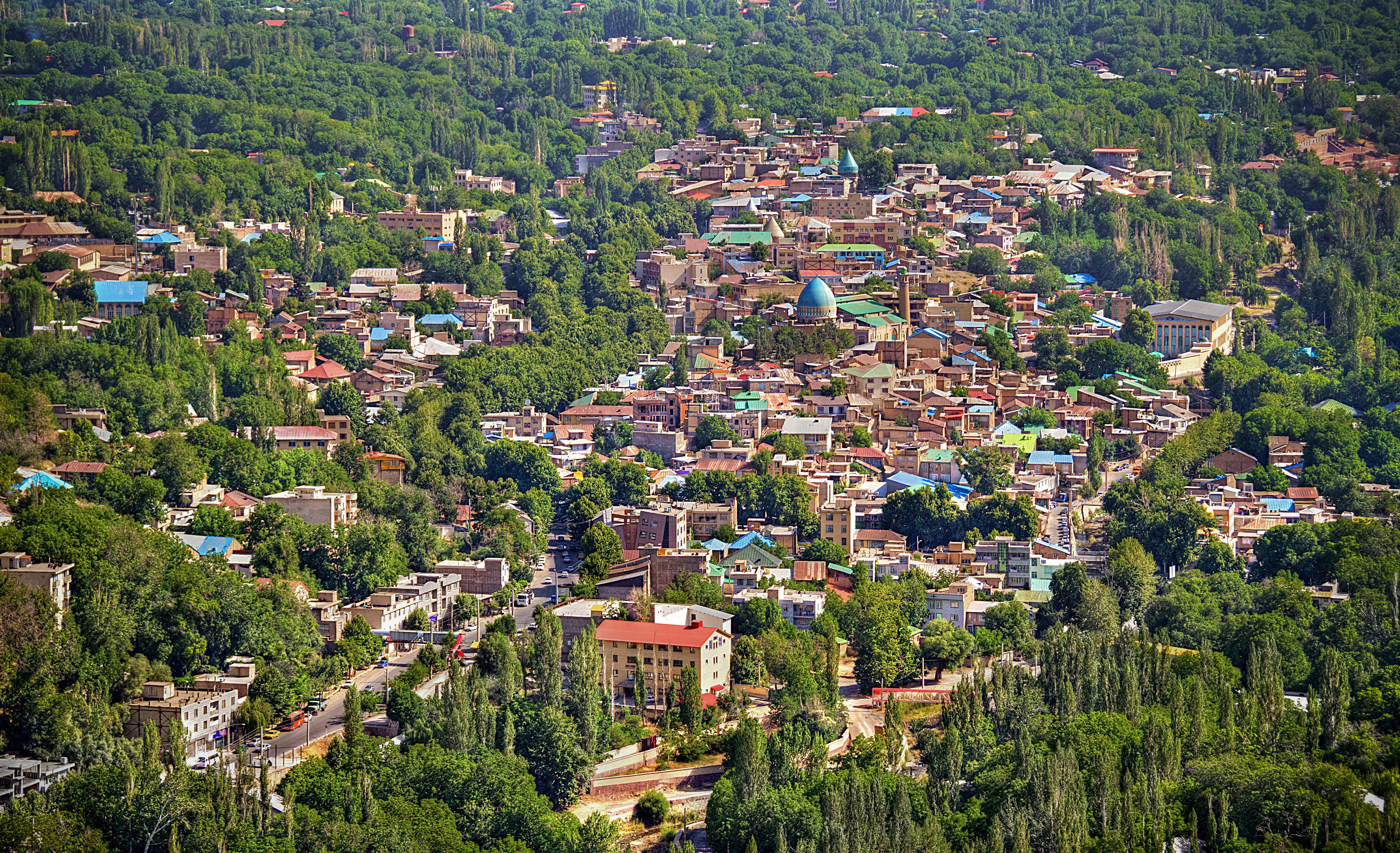
- View of the city of Damavand

- Location within Iran
- Coordinates: 35°41′46″N 52°02′48″E
- Country: Iran
- Province: Tehran
- County: Damavand
- District: Central
- Highest elevation: 2,250 m (7,380 ft)
- Lowest elevation: 1,800 m (5,900 ft)

Population (2016)
  - Total: 48,380
- Time zone: UTC+3:30 (IRST)
- Website: Official website

Damavand (Persian: دماوند) (Note: Also romanized as Damāvand, Damāwand and Demāvend; also known as Qasabehe Damāwand) is a city in the Central District of Damavand County, Tehran province, Iran, serving as capital of both the county and the district.

== Demographics ==
=== Population ===
At the time of the 2006 National Census, the city's population was 36,433 in 10,279 households. The following census in 2011 counted 37,315 people in 11,455 households. The 2016 census measured the population of the city as 48,380 people in 15,267 households.

== Site History ==
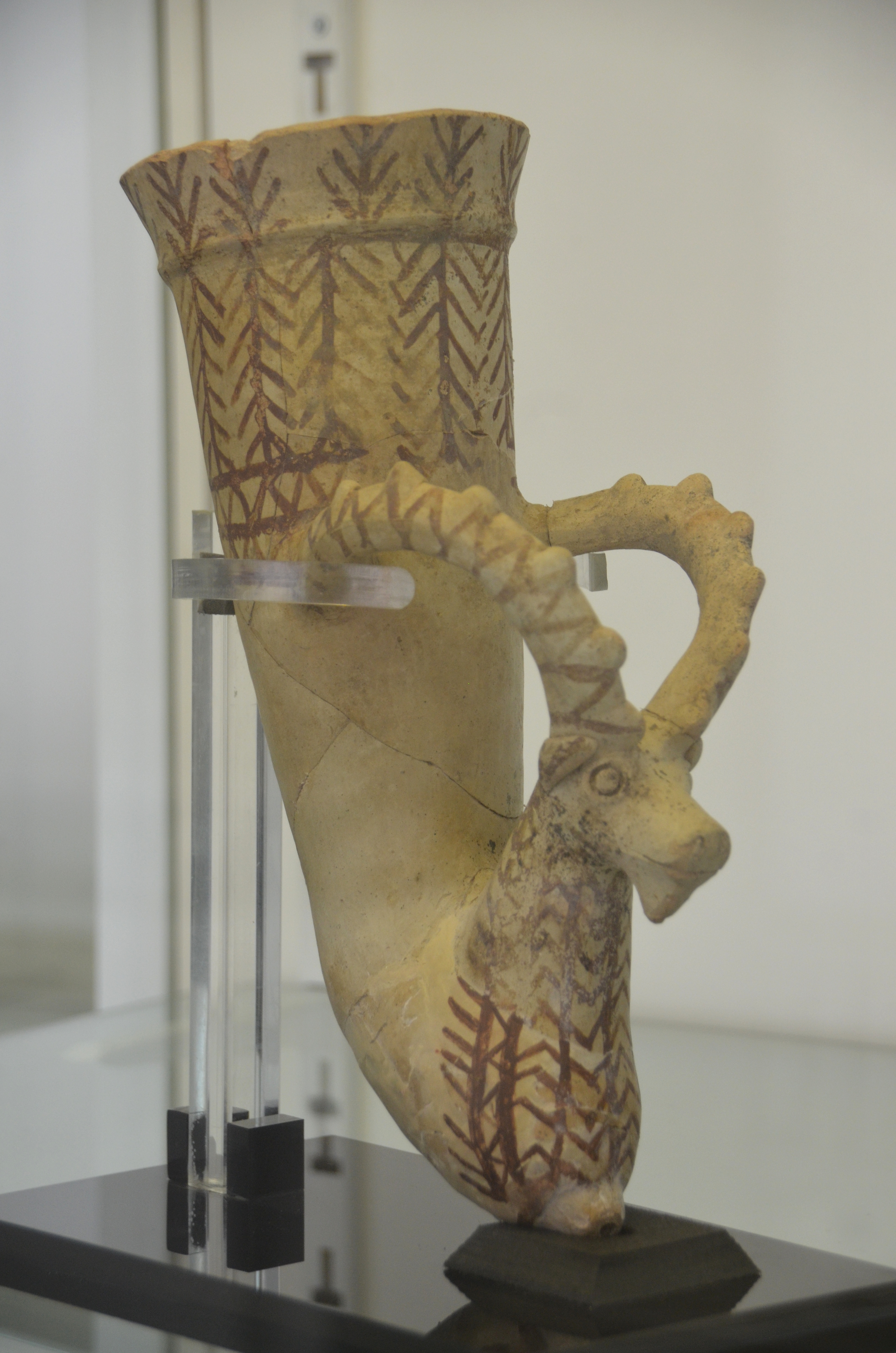
Parthian Rhyton in the shape of an Ibex excavated at Veliran

Damavand is an ancient and historic city. The name Damavand appears in Sassanid texts as Dunbawand, though this likely refers to the nearby mountain of the same name, and not the town, which in pre-Islamic times was called Peshyān. The town lies on the Harāz Road, an significant pass through the Alborz mountains, which made the town an important thoroughfare until the construction of the Tehran-Amol road in 1950 CE.

Just to the east of Damavand lies the historic site of Veliran, where Parthian and Sasanian remains have been found. Excavations carried out by Mohammad-Reza Ne'mati and Ali Sadraie in 2006 and 2007 revealed a Parthian period graveyard, including a major tomb called the 'hypogeum' which included ceramic rhyta in the shape of Ibexes. The excavations also uncovered a later Sasanian period structure.

== Climate ==
Damavand has a humid continental climate with hot summers, very cold snowy winters, and cool rainy springs and autumns (Köppen: Dsa). The average annual temperature is 9.6°C in Damavand.

Climate data for Damavand
Month	Jan	Feb	Mar	Apr	May	Jun	Jul	Aug	Sep	Oct	Nov	Dec	Year
Mean daily maximum °C (°F)	−1.1 (30.0)	0.4 (32.7)	6 (43)	12.4 (54.3)	19.1 (66.4)	25.1 (77.2)	27.6 (81.7)	26.5 (79.7)	22.3 (72.1)	15.5 (59.9)	6.2 (43.2)	1.2 (34.2)	13.4 (56.2)
Daily mean °C (°F)	−4.3 (24.3)	−2.8 (27.0)	2.5 (36.5)	8.5 (47.3)	14.9 (58.8)	20.5 (68.9)	23 (73)	22 (72)	18.2 (64.8)	11.8 (53.2)	2.8 (37.0)	−2 (28)	9.6 (49.2)
Mean daily minimum °C (°F)	−7.9 (17.8)	−6.5 (20.3)	−1.7 (28.9)	3.8 (38.8)	9.7 (49.5)	14.5 (58.1)	17.3 (63.1)	16.6 (61.9)	13.6 (56.5)	8.1 (46.6)	−0.8 (30.6)	−5.5 (22.1)	5.1 (41.2)
Average precipitation mm (inches)	39 (1.5)	46 (1.8)	62 (2.4)	53 (2.1)	32 (1.3)	12 (0.5)	11 (0.4)	8 (0.3)	8 (0.3)	26 (1.0)	39 (1.5)	38 (1.5)	374 (14.6)
Average precipitation days (≥ 1.0 mm)	6	7	7	7	5	2	2	1	2	4	6	5	54
Average relative humidity (%)	59	61	56	49	35	27	30	30	30	41	60	60	45
Source: https://en.climate-data.org/asia/iran/tehran/damavand-768465/

== Economy ==
Damavand is an agricultural city, and due to its streams, rivers, springs and temperate climate, it has numerous gardens and fields. An important part of the city's economy is provided by the export of tree products. Apples, pears, cherries, apricots, walnuts, tomatoes, wheat, potatoes, beans, and cucumbers are some of the products of this city, some of which, like apples and pears, are famous and distinguished in terms of type. In recent years, beekeeping has become one of the sources of income for the people of this city, and Damavand honey competes with the best honey in Iran in terms of quality and constitutes a significant part of the city's exports. New style livestock has been developed in Damavand for several years, and the obtained products are exported to Tehran in addition to meeting the needs of the region.

== Transportation ==
Damavand can be reached by road from Firuzkuh via Gilavand and from Haraz road, via Mosha.

== Historical attractions ==
Damavand contains 37 historical tombs (Imamzadeh), 27 castle ruins, 23 traditional houses of architectural significance, 18 traditional bath houses, 6 caves, 5 historical bridges, 3 historical mosques, and 3 caravanserais.

The main landmarks are the Friday Mosque (15th century) and the Sheikh Shebli Mausoleum and Tower, dating to the Seljuq era.

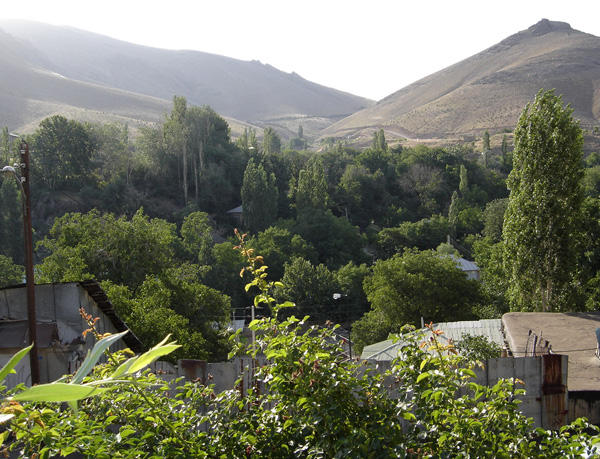
View of Damavand and the Alborz Mountains

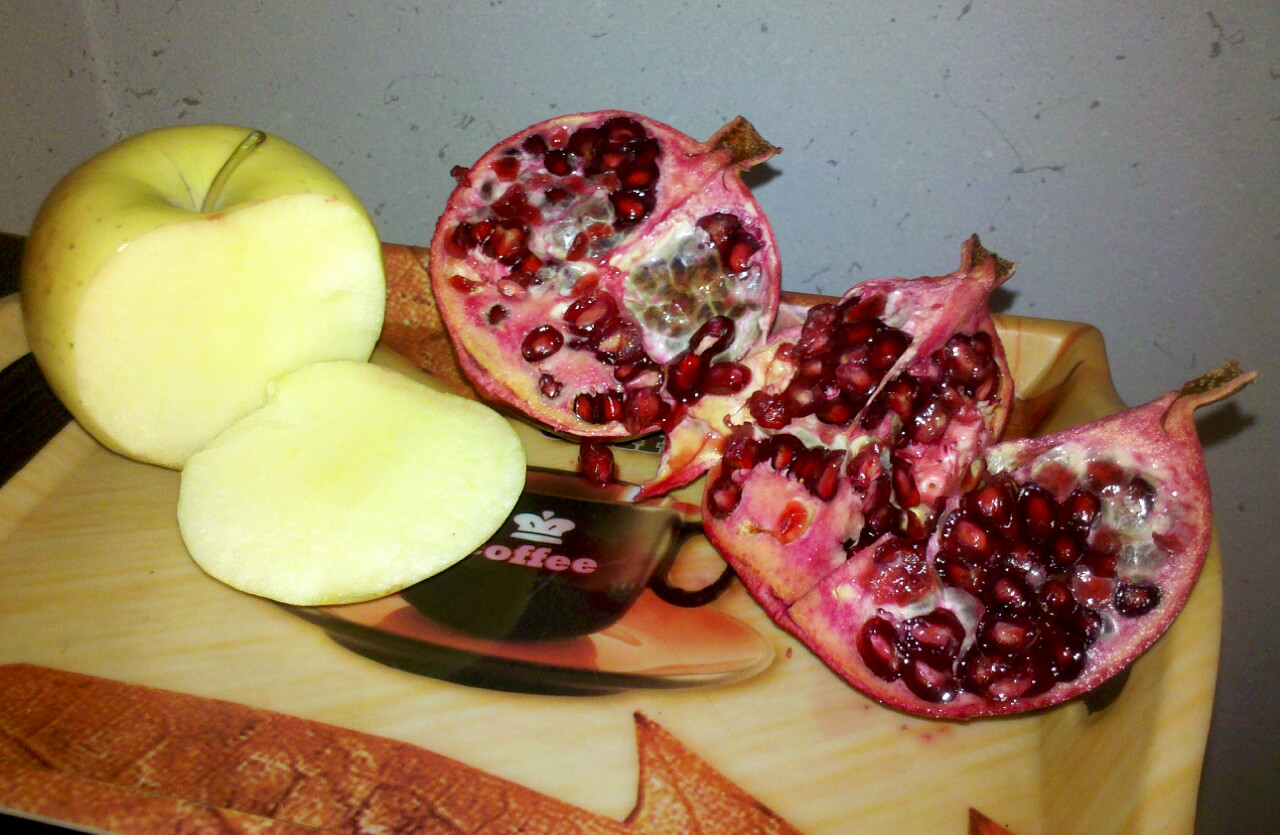
Damavand's pomegranate and apple

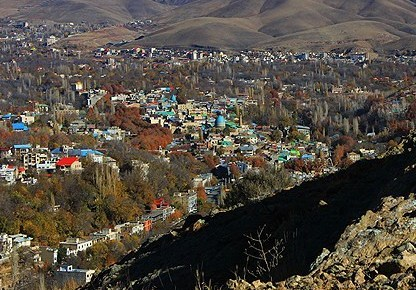

== See also ==
- Shebeli Tower

Media related to Damavand at Wikimedia Commons
