= Neyzar, Qom =

Village in Qom province, Iran

Neyzar Persian: نيزار
- Village
- Location within Iran
- Coordinates: 34°18′29″N 50°32′16″E
- Country: Iran
- Province: Qom
- County: Qom
- District: Salafchegan
- Rural District: Neyzar

Population (2016)
  - Total: 296
- Time zone: UTC+3:30 (IRST)

Neyzar (Persian: نيزار) (Note: Also romanized as Nayzar and Neyzār; also known as Nāzar) is a village in, and the capital of, Neyzar Rural District in Salafchegan District of Qom County, Qom province, Iran.

== Demographics ==
=== Population ===
At the time of the 2006 National Census, the village's population was 320 in 91 households. The following census in 2011 counted 326 people in 102 households. The 2016 census measured the population of the village as 296 people in 100 households.
