= Sadreh-ye Seyyed Yaqub =

Sadreh-ye Seyyed Yaqub صدره سيديعقوب
- Village
- Location within Iran
- Coordinates: 31°24′51″N 48°27′00″E
- Country: Iran
- Province: Khuzestan
- County: Ahvaz
- Bakhsh: Hamidiyeh
- Rural District: Jahad

Population (2006)
  - Total: 95
- Time zone: UTC+3:30 (IRST)
  - Summer (DST): UTC+4:30 (IRDT)

Sadreh-ye Seyyed Yaqub (Persian: صدره سيديعقوب, also Romanized as Şadreh-ye Seyyed Ya‘qūb; also known as Sadreh, Sadrehé Yek, Sadreh-ye Yek, Sedreh-ye Yek, and Seyyed Ya‘qūb) is a village in Jahad Rural District, Hamidiyeh District, Ahvaz County, Khuzestan Province, Iran. At the 2006 census, its population was 95, in 22 families.
