= Batuli, Punjab =

Batuli
- Village
- Location in Punjab, India Batuli (India)
- Coordinates: 31.1667414°N 75.96823°E
- Country: India
- State: Punjab
- District: Shaheed Bhagat Singh Nagar

Government
  - Type: Panchayat raj
  - Body: Gram panchayat
- Elevation: 251 m (823 ft)

Population (2011)
  - Total: 55
- Sex ratio 25/29 ♂/♀

Languages
  - Official: Punjabi
- Time zone: UTC+5:30 (IST)
- PIN: 144507
- Telephone code: 01884
- ISO 3166 code: IN-PB
- Post office: Mukandpur
- Website: nawanshahr.nic.in

Batuli is a village in Shaheed Bhagat Singh Nagar district of Punjab State, India. It is situated on Gosal-Batuli road and located 4.3 kilometres (2.7 mi) away from Banga, 26 kilometres (16 mi) from Phagwara, 16.6 kilometres (10.3 mi) from district headquarter Shaheed Bhagat Singh Nagar and 108 kilometres (67 mi) from state capital Chandigarh. The village is administrated by Sarpanch an elected representative of the village.

== Demography ==
As of 2011, Batuli has a total number of 11 houses and population of 54 of which 25 include are males while 29 are females according to the report published by Census India in 2011. The literacy rate of Batuli is 75.51%, lower than the state average of 75.84%. The population of children under the age of 6 years is 5 which is 9.26% of total population of Batuli, and child sex ratio is approximately 4000 as compared to Punjab state average of 846.

As per the report published by Census India in 2011, 16 people were engaged in work activities out of the total population of Batuli which includes 16 males and 0 females. According to census survey report 2011, 99% workers describe their work as main work and 1% workers are involved in Marginal activity providing livelihood for less than 6 months.

== Education ==
Amardeep Singh Shergill Memorial college Mukandpur and Sikh National College Banga are the nearest colleges. Lovely Professional University is 32.6 kilometres (20.3 mi) away from the village.

List of schools nearby Batuli:

- Sat Modern Public School, Mangat Dingrian
- Guru Teg Bahadur Model School, Behram
- Guru Ram Dass Public School, Cheta
- Lovely Public School, Pathlawa

== Transport ==
Banga train station is the nearest train station however, Phagwara Junction railway station is 24 kilometres (15 mi) away from the village. Sahnewal Airport is the nearest domestic airport which located 58 kilometres (36 mi) away in Ludhiana and the nearest international airport is located in Chandigarh also Sri Guru Ram Dass Jee International Airport is the second nearest airport which is 141 kilometres (88 mi) away in Amritsar.

== See also ==
- List of villages in India
