= Mohseniyeh =

Mohseniyeh محسنيه
- Village
- Location within Iran
- Coordinates: 30°29′42″N 49°59′39″E
- Country: Iran
- Province: Khuzestan
- County: Omidiyeh
- Bakhsh: Central
- Rural District: Asiab

Population (2006)
  - Total: 126
- Time zone: UTC+3:30 (IRST)
  - Summer (DST): UTC+4:30 (IRDT)

Mohseniyeh (Persian: محسنيه, also Romanized as Moḩsenīyeh) is a village in Asiab Rural District, in the Central District of Omidiyeh County, Khuzestan Province, Iran. At the 2006 census, its population was 126, in 23 families.
