= Neyzar Rural District =

Rural district in Qom province, Iran

Neyzar Rural District Persian: دهستان نيزار
- Rural District
- Location within Iran
- Coordinates: 34°22′N 50°35′E
- Country: Iran
- Province: Qom
- County: Qom
- District: Salafchegan
- Established: 1987
- Capital: Neyzar

Population (2016)
  - Total: 4,620
- Time zone: UTC+3:30 (IRST)

Neyzar Rural District (Persian: دهستان نيزار) is in Salafchegan District of Qom County, Qom province, Iran. Its capital is the village of Neyzar.

== Demographics ==
=== Population ===
At the time of the 2006 National Census, the rural district's population was 4,155 in 1,150 households. There were 4,068 inhabitants in 1,258 households at the following census of 2011. The 2016 census measured the population of the rural district as 4,620 in 1,477 households. The most populous of its 24 villages was Tayqan, with 1,194 people.

=== Other villages in the rural district ===
- Aliabad
- Cheshmeh Ali
- Hajjiabad-e Neyzaz
- Khadijeh Khatun
- Khalajabad
- Qaleh Cham
