= Neyzar, Kerman =

Neyzar ني زار
- Village
- Location within Iran
- Coordinates: 30°02′46″N 56°04′02″E
- Country: Iran
- Province: Kerman
- County: Rafsanjan
- Bakhsh: Central
- Rural District: Sarcheshmeh

Population (2006)
  - Total: 17
- Time zone: UTC+3:30 (IRST)
  - Summer (DST): UTC+4:30 (IRDT)

Neyzar (Persian: ني زار, also Romanized as Neyzār) is a village in Sarcheshmeh Rural District, in the Central District of Rafsanjan County, Kerman Province, Iran. At the 2006 census, its population was 17, in 7 families.
