= Khalida Toumi =

Algerian politician and feminist

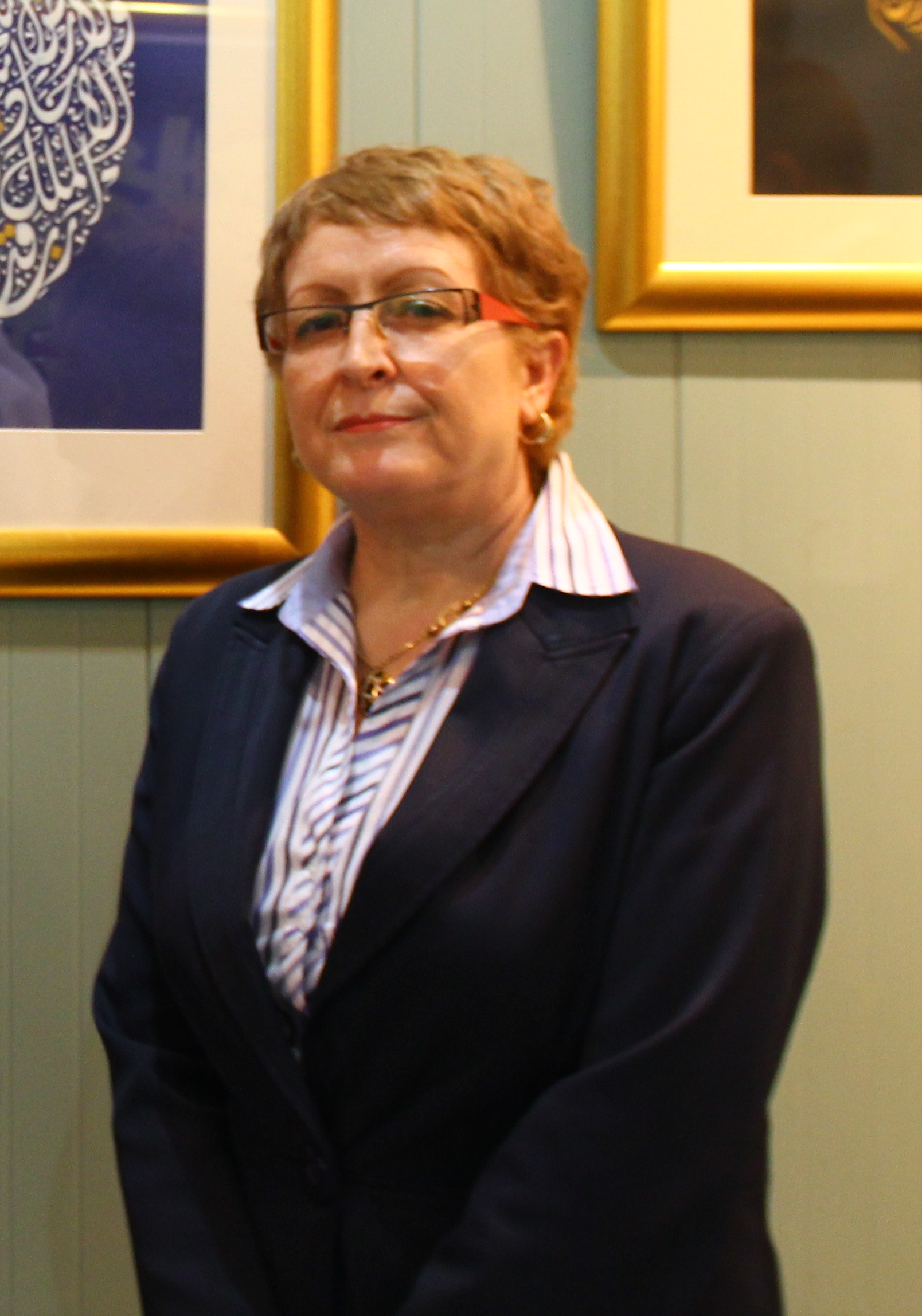

Minister of Culture
- In office 17 June 2002 – 5 May 2014
- Preceded by: Mohammed Abbou
- Succeeded by: Nadia Labidi

Personal details
- Born: 13 March 1958 (age 68) Ain Bessem, Bouira, Algeria
- Party: National Liberation Front
- Education: University of Algiers; École Normale Supérieure
- Profession: Teacher, activist, politician

Khalida Toumi (Arabic: خليدة تومي; born 13 March 1958), also known as Khalida Messaoudi (Arabic: خليدة مسعودي), is an Algerian politician. She was the Minister of Communication and Culture until April 2014. She is also a feminist activist, and a pioneer of Algerian feminism. In 2022, she was convicted of corruption and sentenced to six years in prison.

== Early life ==
Khalida Toumi was known as Khalida Messaoudi ou la soufadja before she reclaimed her maiden name. She was born in 1958 in Ain-Bessem, Kabylie, in the north of Algeria and entered the University of Algiers in 1977 to pursue a degree in mathematics. After graduating from the École Normale Supérieure in Paris, she taught mathematics until 1993. Her brother is Alek Baylee Toumi, the Algerian academic, author and expert on French and Francophone issues.

== Early career ==
As a feminist activist, in 1981, she founded the Collectif féminin (Women's Grouping) not only to oppose the ministerial interdiction on Algerian women leaving the country unless accompanied by a male family member, but also to oppose state endorsement of the discriminatory (seen by her) Algerian Family Code, which the National Assembly eventually adopted in 1984. Following the adoption of this code, Toumi presided over the Association for Equality between Men and Women, founded by a group of Trotskyist militants. In 1985, Toumi co-founded and became a member of the executive committee of the Algerian League of Human Rights. She later distanced herself from the Trotskyist militants and in 1990 founded the Independent Association for the Triumph of Women's Rights.

Toumi staunchly opposed Islamist ideology and endorsed the cancellation of the January 1992 legislative elections, which the Islamic Salvation Front (FIS) was poised to win. She considered the FIS to display "absolutely all the classic ingredients of totalitarian populist movements." The FIS condemned her to death in 1993, and she was injured in a June 1994 bomb attack on a secularist demonstration.

Toumi continued her opposition and traveled to Western countries to provide an anti-Islamist and anti-terrorist perspective. In 1993, Toumi published Une Algérienne Debout (Unbowed: an Algerian woman confronts Islamic fundamentalism), which was translated into English in 1998. In 1998, she was awarded the Liberal International Prize for Freedom and an honorary doctorate from the Catholic University of Louvain, Belgium.

A member of the Rassemblement pour la Culture et la Démocratie (RCD), she won a seat in the National Assembly and served as the RCD's national vice president for human rights and women's issues. After profound disagreements with the RCD's president Saïd Sadi, she severed relations with the RCD in January 2001, at the peak of the crisis in her native Kabylie; she was subsequently expelled from the RCD.

She has been regularly portrayed in political cartoons.

== Minister of Culture and Communication ==
In May 2002, she was appointed Minister of Culture and Communication, replacing Mohammed Abbou, as well as the government's spokesperson in 2003, the first woman ever to hold that job. She held her ministerial post until April 2014. During her tenure, the national culture budget grew from $64 million to over $300 million.

As Minister of Culture and Communication, in July 2006, Toumi was the government representative at the Journee Arab de la Culture (Arab Day of Culture) held in Algiers. In 2009, she opened the Second Pan-African Culture Festival, also held in Algiers.

In 2008, Toumi ordered that Mohammed Benchicou's Journal d'un homme libre (A free man's notebook) be seized at the printers due to its allegedly antihistorical, subversive and racist content.

In 2012, she attended the laying of the foundation stone for the Algiers Opera House at Ouled Fayet.

In 2014 she issued a decree that historic Algiers slaughterhouses were not to be demolished and that they were pending classification as sites of national culture heritage.

== Professional experience ==
- 1984-1991 Teacher of mathematics
- 1992-1993 Member of the (CCN): Conseil consultatif national.
- 1997-2002 Deputy of Algiers at the People's National Assembly (l’Assemblée populaire nationale).
- 2000-2001 Vice-president of the (CNRSE) Commission nationale de réforme du système éducatif (National Commission to Reform the Educational System)

== Political activities ==
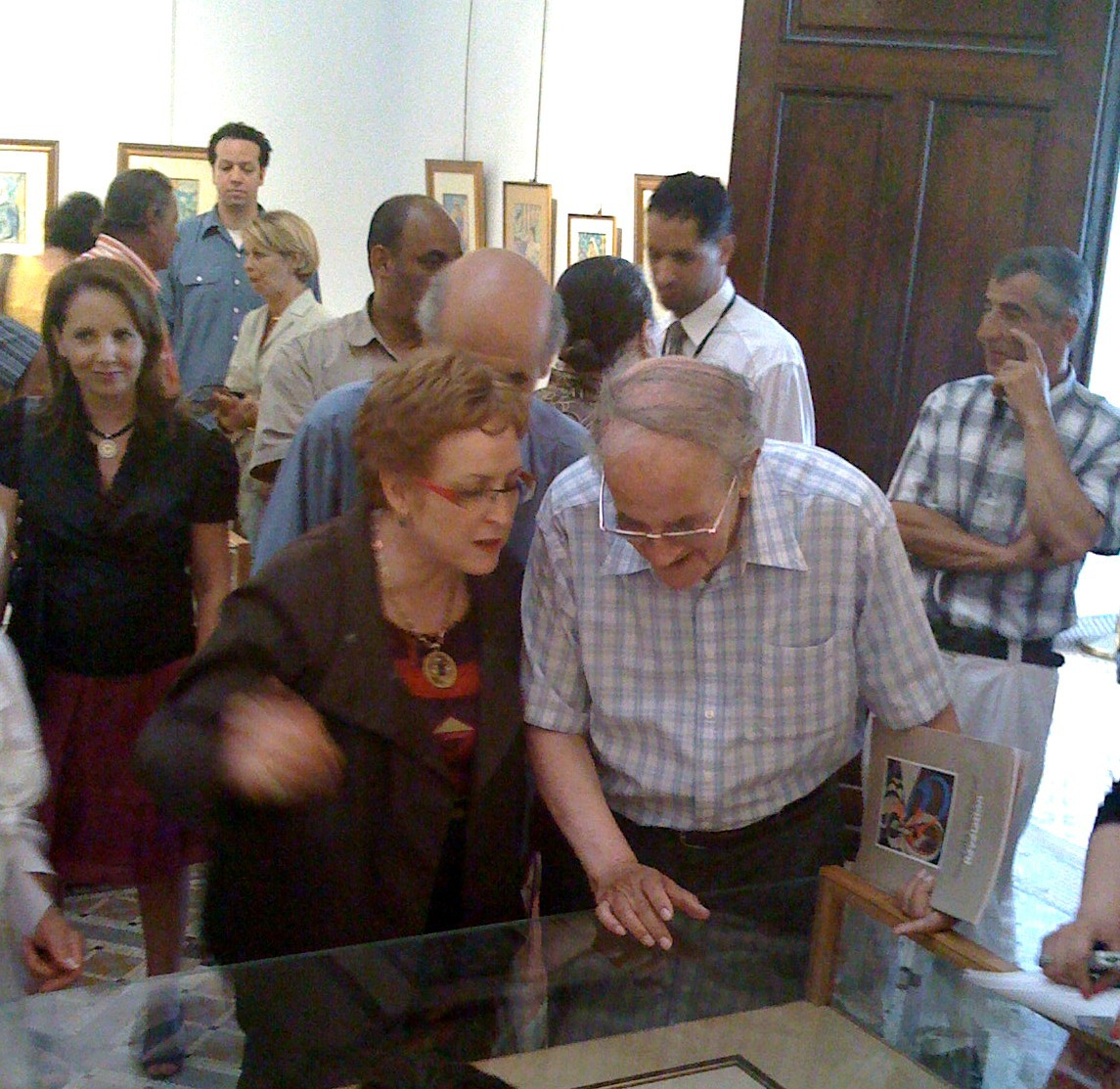
Khalida Toumi in 2009

- May 1985 founding member and president of the first Association of Independent Women.
- March 1985 founding member and vice-president of the first Algerian League of Human Rights.
- January 1992 Member of the CNSA and of the CCN.
- April 1996 – 2001 Member of the secularist party: the RCD, excluded in July 2001.
- 1997-2002 Deputy of Algiers at the (APN) under the RCD label
- October 1993 Vice president of Mouvement pour la République (MPR).
- 9 May 2003 Algerian Minister of Communication and Culture.

== Conviction ==
In 2022, Toumi was convicted of corruption, including squandering public funds, abuse of office and granting undue privileges, and was sentenced to six years in prison. The accusations were related to events that occurred and were funded during her tenure as Minister of Culture and Communications, including the African Festival in 2009, and Algeria, Capital of Arab Culture in 2007. However, in July 2022, Toumi was released from prison, on the basis of a conditional release program.

== See also ==
- Cabinet of Algeria
