= Darkhoveyn District =

District in Khuzestan province, Iran

Darkhoveyn District Persian: بخش دارخوین
- District
- Location within Iran
- Coordinates: 30°46′39″N 48°29′05″E
- Country: Iran
- Province: Khuzestan
- County: Shadegan
- Established: 2012
- Capital: Darkhoveyn

Population (2016)
  - Total: 14,754
- Time zone: UTC+3:30 (IRST)

Darkhoveyn District (Persian: بخش دارخوین) is in Shadegan County, Khuzestan province, Iran. Its capital is the city of Darkhoveyn.

== History ==
In 2012, Darkhoveyn Rural District and the city of Darkhoveyn were separated from the Central District in the formation of Darkhoveyn District.

== Demographics ==
=== Population ===
At the time of the 2016 National Census, the district's population was 14,754 inhabitants in 3,705 households.

=== Administrative divisions ===
Darkhoveyn District Population
Administrative Divisions	2016
Darisiyeh RD	5,037
Darkhoveyn RD	4,062
Darkhoveyn (city)	5,655
Total	14,754
RD = Rural District
