= Abdoliyeh-ye Sharqi Rural District =

Rural district in Khuzestan province, Iran

Abdoliyeh-ye Sharqi Rural District Persian: دهستان عبدليه شرقي
- Rural District
- Location within Iran
- Coordinates: 30°46′39″N 49°27′01″E
- Country: Iran
- Province: Khuzestan
- County: Ramshir
- District: Central
- Capital: Abdoliyeh

Population (2016)
  - Total: 7,860
- Time zone: UTC+3:30 (IRST)

Abdoliyeh-ye Sharqi Rural District (Persian: دهستان عبدليه شرقي) (Note: Formerly Abdoliyeh Rural District (دهستان عبدليه)) is in the Central District of Ramshir County, Khuzestan province, Iran. Its capital is the village of Abdoliyeh.

== Demographics ==
=== Population ===
At the time of the 2006 National Census, the rural district's population was 7,035 in 1,192 households. There were 6,958 inhabitants in 1,694 households at the following census of 2011. The 2016 census measured the population of the rural district as 7,860 in 2,097 households. The most populous of its 74 villages was Sen, with 568 people.
