= Darkhoveyn Rural District =

Rural district in Khuzestan province, Iran

Darkhoveyn Rural District Persian: دهستان دارخوين
- Rural District
- Location within Iran
- Coordinates: 30°42′41″N 48°24′44″E
- Country: Iran
- Province: Khuzestan
- County: Shadegan
- District: Darkhoveyn
- Capital: Darkhoveyn

Population (2016)
  - Total: 4,062
- Time zone: UTC+3:30 (IRST)

Darkhoveyn Rural District (Persian: دهستان دارخوين) is in Darkhoveyn District of Shadegan County, Khuzestan province, Iran. It is administered from the city of Darkhoveyn.

== Demographics ==
=== Population ===
At the time of the 2006 National Census, the rural district's population (as a part of the Central District) was 13,182 in 2,200 households. There were 8,339 inhabitants in 1,832 households at the following census of 2011. The 2016 census measured the population of the rural district as 4,062 in 997 households, by which time the rural district had been separated from the district in the formation of Darkhoveyn District. The most populous of its 24 villages was Makaniyeh-ye Salahaviyeh, with 909 people.
