= Abdoliyeh-ye Gharbi Rural District =

Rural district in Khuzestan province, Iran

Abdoliyeh-ye Gharbi Rural District Persian: دهستان عبدليه غربي
- Rural District
- Location within Iran
- Coordinates: 30°56′01″N 49°18′42″E
- Country: Iran
- Province: Khuzestan
- County: Ramshir
- District: Central
- Capital: Safheh

Population (2016)
  - Total: 4,707
- Time zone: UTC+3:30 (IRST)

Abdoliyeh-ye Gharbi Rural District (Persian: دهستان عبدليه غربي) is in the Central District of Ramshir County, Khuzestan province, Iran. Its capital is the village of Safheh.

== Demographics ==
=== Population ===
At the time of the 2006 National Census, the rural district's population was 4,205 in 734 households. There were 4,356 inhabitants in 968 households at the following census of 2011. The 2016 census measured the population of the rural district as 4,707 in 1,198 households. The most populous of its 32 villages was Agleh Zovihed, with 721 people.
