= Ramshir County =

County in Khuzestan province, Iran

Ramshir County Persian: شهرستان رامشیر
- County
- Location of Ramshir County in Khuzestan province (center right, pink)

- Location of Khuzestan province in Iran
- Coordinates: 30°57′N 49°24′E
- Country: Iran
- Province: Khuzestan
- Capital: Ramshir
- Districts: Central, Moshrageh

Population (2016)
  - Total: 54,004
- Time zone: UTC+3:30 (IRST)

Ramshir County (Persian: شهرستان رامشیر) is in Khuzestan province, Iran. Its capital is the city of Ramshir.

== History ==
After the 2006 National Census, the village of Moshrageh merged with two other villages and was elevated to the status of a city.

== Demographics ==
=== Population ===
At the time of the 2006 census, the county's population was 49,238 in 9,296 households. The following census in 2011 counted 48,943 people in 11,390 households. The 2016 census measured the population of the county as 54,004 in 14,113 households.

=== Administrative divisions ===
Ramshir County's population history and administrative structure over three consecutive censuses are shown in the following table.

Ramshir County Population
Administrative Divisions	2006	2011	2016
Central District	36,022	34,322	37,576
Abdoliyeh-ye Gharbi RD	4,205	4,356	4,707
Abdoliyeh-ye Sharqi RD (Note: Formerly Abdoliyeh Rural District)	7,035	6,958	7,860
Ramshir (city)	24,782	23,008	25,009
Moshrageh District	13,216	14,621	16,428
Azadeh RD	8,225	7,407	7,039
Moshrageh RD	4,991	5,421	7,294
Moshrageh (city)		1,793	2,095
Total	49,238	48,943	54,004
RD = Rural District

== See also ==
Media related to Ramshir County at Wikimedia Commons
