= Central District (Ramshir County) =

District in Khuzestan province, Iran

Central District (Ramshir County) Persian: بخش مرکزی شهرستان رامشیر
- District
- Location within Iran
- Coordinates: 30°51′16″N 49°21′45″E
- Country: Iran
- Province: Khuzestan
- County: Ramshir
- Capital: Ramshir

Population (2016)
  - Total: 37,576
- Time zone: UTC+3:30 (IRST)

The Central District of Ramshir County (Persian: بخش مرکزی شهرستان رامشیر) is in Khuzestan province, Iran. Its capital is the city of Ramshir.

== Demographics ==
=== Population ===
At the time of the 2006 National Census, the district's population wasAt the National Census in 2006, its population was 36,022 in 6,530 households. The following census in 2011 counted 34,322 people in 7,825 households. The 2016 census measured the population of the district as 37,576 inhabitants in 9,831 households.

=== Administrative divisions ===
Central District (Ramshir County) Population
Administrative Divisions	2006	2011	2016
Abdoliyeh-ye Gharbi RD	4,205	4,356	4,707
Abdoliyeh-ye Sharqi RD (Note: Formerly Abdoliyeh Rural District)	7,035	6,958	7,860
Ramshir (city)	24,782	23,008	25,009
Total	36,022	34,322	37,576
RD = Rural District
