= Gulistan =

Gulistan, Golestan or Golastan (Persian: گلستان) means "flower land" or "rose garden" in Persian language (gol meaning "flower" or "rose", and -stan meaning "land" or "garden").

It may refer to:

== Places ==
=== Iran ===
"Golestan" most often refers to:

- Golestan province in northeast Iran.
- Golestan, Tehran Province, a city in Tehran Province

==== Alborz Province ====
- Gulistan, Alborz, a village in Alborz Province

==== Ardabil Province ====
- Golestan, Ardabil, a village in Nir County
- Golestan-e Bala, a village in Khalkhal County
- Golestan-e Pain, a village in Khalkhal County

==== Bushehr Province ====
- Golestan, Bushehr, a village in Jam County
- Golestan, Dashti, a village in Dashti County

==== East Azerbaijan Province ====
- Golestan-e Olya, a village in Maragheh County
- Golestan-e Sofla, a village in Maragheh County
- Golestan Park, a park in Tabriz, Iran

==== Fars Province ====
- Golestan, Fars, a village in Shiraz County
- Shahrak-e Golestan, a village in Shiraz County

==== Gilan Province ====
- Golestan, Gilan, a village in Lahijan County
- Golestan Sara, a village in Siahkal County

==== Golestan Province ====
- Golestan National Park
- Golestan, Golestan, a village in Golestan Province

==== Hormozgan Province ====
- Golestan, Hormozgan, a village in Hormozgan Province

==== Isfahan Province ====
- Golestan-e Mehdi, a village in Ardestan County
- Golestan-e Shahid Rejai, a village in Ardestan County
- Golastan, Isfahan, a village in Isfahan County
- Golestan, Nain, a village in Nain County
- Golestan Rural District (Isfahan Province), in Falavarjan County

==== Kerman Province ====
- Golestan, Anar, a village in Anar County
- Golestan, Arzuiyeh, a village in Arzuiyeh County
- Golestan, Kahnuj, a village in Kahnuj County
- Golestan, Sirjan, a village in Sirjan County
- Golestan District (Sirjan County), an administrative division of Sirjan County
- Golestan Rural District (Sirjan County), an administrative division of Sirjan County

==== Khuzestan Province ====
- Golestan, Masjed Soleyman, a village in Khuzestan Province

==== Kohgiluyeh and Boyer-Ahmad Province ====
- Golestan-e Emamzadeh Jafar, a village in Gachsaran County

==== Lorestan Province ====
- Golestan, Lorestan, a village in Lorestan Province
- Golestan, alternate name of Golestanak, Lorestan

==== Mazandaran Province ====
- Golestan Mahalleh, a village in Tonekabon County

==== North Khorasan Province ====
- Golestan Rural District (North Khorasan Province)

==== Qom Province ====
- Golestan, Qom, a village in Qom Province

==== Razavi Khorasan Province ====
- Golestan, Firuzeh, a village in Firuzeh County
- Golestan, Mahvelat, a village in Mahvelat County

==== Semnan Province ====
- Golestan, Semnan, a village in Semnan Province, Iran

==== South Khorasan Province ====
- Golestan, South Khorasan, a village in South Khorasan Province, Iran

==== Tehran Province ====
- Golestan, Tehran Province, a suburban city of Tehran
- Golestan Palace in Tehran
- Golestan District (Baharestan County), an administrative subdivision of Tehran Province

==== Zanjan Province ====
- Golestan, Zanjan, a village in Zanjan County
- Golestan, Tarom, a village in Tarom County

=== Armenia and Azerbaijan ===
- Gulistan, former name of Nor Aznaberd, Armenia
- Gülüstan, Goranboy, a village in the Shahumian region of Nagorno-Karabakh, Azerbaijan
- Gülüstan, Nakhchivan, Azerbaijan

=== Pakistan ===
- Gulistan, Balochistan, located in Qilla Abdullah District, Balochistan
- Gulistan, Punjab, village in Punjab
- Gulistan Tehsil
- Gulistan-e-Johar, a neighbourhood of Gulshan-e-Iqbal Town in Karachi, Sindh
- Gulistan-e-Bahar, a neighbourhood of Orangi Town in Karachi, Sindh
- Gulistan-e-Hadeed, a neighbourhood of Gulshan-e-Iqbal Town in Karachi, Sindh

=== Tajikistan ===
- Guliston, Rudaki District, a village near Dushanbe
- Guliston, Sughd, a city in Sughd Region
- Guliston, Shahriston District, a village in Sughd Region
- Guliston, Vahdat, a part of the city Vahdat

=== Other places ===
- Gulistan District in Farah Province, Afghanistan
- Gulistan, Dhaka, in Dhaka, Bangladesh
- Gulistan underpass in Dhaka, Bangladesh
- Gulistan, Baramulla, in Jammu and Kashmir, India
- Gulistan Terrace & Gulistan Cottages, Rathmines, Dublin, Ireland
- Guliston, Uzbekistan

== Other uses ==
- Gulistan (book), a work by the Persian poet Saadi
- Gulistan (Sorabji), a piano piece by English composer Kaikhosru Shapurji Sorabji
- Gulistan rug, created by Karagheusian Rug Mill
- Treaty of Gulistan (1813), between imperial Russia and Qajarid Persia signed at Gulistan, Nagorno-Karabakh
- Gulestan Rustom Billimoria, Indian writer, painter, philanthropist and social worker
- Gülistan Turan (born 1997), Turkish female Muay Thai practitioner
- Melikdom of Gulistan, one of Melikdoms of Karabakh
- Guliston (magazine), an Uzbek-language magazine

== See also ==
- Gulstan (disambiguation)
- Gulshan (disambiguation)
- Rose Garden (disambiguation)
