= Darreh Bagh =

Darreh Bagh or Darrehbagh (Persian: دره باغ) may refer to:

== Chaharmahal and Bakhtiari Province ==
- Darreh Bagh, Kuhrang, a village in Kuhrang County
- Darreh Bagh, Lordegan, a village in Lordegan County

== Isfahan Province ==
- Darreh Bagh, Isfahan, a village in Ardestan County

== Kerman Province ==
- Darreh Bagh, Kerman, a village in Shahr-e Babak County

== Lorestan Province ==
- Darreh Bagh, Azna, a village in Azna County
- Darreh Bagh, Khorramabad, a village in Khorramabad County
- Darreh Bagh, Pol-e Dokhtar, a village in Pol-e Dokhtar County

== Yazd Province ==
- Darreh Bagh, Yazd, a village in Taft County

== See also ==
- Dar Bagh (disambiguation)
