= Dar Bagh =

Dar Bagh or Darbagh or Dar-e Bagh (Persian: درباغ) may refer to:

- Darbagh, Gilan
- Darbagh, Hormozgan
- Dar Bagh, Isfahan
- Dar Bagh, Bam, Kerman Province
- Dar Bagh, Shahr-e Babak, Kerman Province
- Dar Bagh, Lorestan
- Darbagh, Yazd

== See also ==
- Darreh Bagh (disambiguation)
