= Gulshan =

Gulshan, Golshan, or Gulsan may refer to:

== Given name ==
=== Gulsan ===
- Gulsan Mullick (born 1958), Indian politician

=== Gulshan ===
- Gulshan Ajmani, Indian politician
- Gulshan Alimardanova (born 2006), Uzbek karateka
- Gulshan Devaiah (born 1978), Indian actor
- Gulshan Ewing (1928–2020), Indian journalist and socialite
- Gulshan Grover (born 1955), Indian actor
- Gulshan Gurbanova (1950–2006), Azerbaijani actress
- Gulshan Hossain (born 1962), Bangladeshi artist
- Gulshan Jha (born 2006), Nepalese cricketer
- Gulshan Khan (born 1983), South African photographer
- Gulshan Rai Khatri (1944–2020), Indian medical doctor and public health specialist
- Gulshan Kumar (1951–1997), Indian businessman
- Gulshan Mehra (1937–1986), Indian cricketer
- Gulshan Kumar Mehta (1937–2009), Indian lyricist
- Gulshan Nanda (1929–1984), Indian novelist and screenwriter
- Gulshan Pashayeva (born 1961), Azerbaijani linguist, political analyst, and politician
- Gulshan Rai (1924–2004), Indian film producer and distributor
- Gulshan Saeed, Pakistani politician
- Gulshan Ara Syed, Pakistani ghazal singer
- Gulshan Lal Tandon (died 2012), Indian businessman

== Surname ==
- Paramjit Kaur Gulshan (born 1949), Indian politician

== Places ==
Bangladesh

- Gulshan Thana, a neighbourhood in Dhaka, Bangladesh

Iran

- Gulshan or Golshan, former name of Tabas, South Khorasan province, Iran
- Golshan, alternate name of Gavmishabad, Ahvaz, Khuzestan province, Iran
- Golshan, another name for Afif-Abad Garden, in Shiraz, Iran
- Golshan Gas Field, Iran
- Golshan, Gilan, a village in Bandar-e Anzali County, Gilan province, Iran
- Golshan, Hormozgan, a village in Bandar Lengeh County, Hormozgan province, Iran
- Golshan, Isfahan, a city in Dehaqan County, Isfahan province, Iran
- Golshan, Anar, a village in Anar County, Kerman province, Iran
- Golshan, Kohgiluyeh and Boyer-Ahmad, a village in Boyer-Ahmad County, Kohgiluyeh and Boyer-Ahmad province, Iran
- Golshan, Kurdistan
- Golshan, Nishapur, a village in Nishapur County, Razavi Khorasan province, Iran
- Golshan, Miyan Jolgeh, a village in Nishapur County, Razavi Khorasan province, Iran
- Golshan Rural District, in South Khorasan province, Iran
- Golshan, alternate name of Nahr-e Sen, Khuzestan province, Iran

Pakistan

- Gulshan-e-Iqbal Town or Gulshan Town, a town in Karachi, Sindh, Pakistan
- Gulshan-e-Iqbal or Gulshan-e-Iqbal II, two neighborhoods of Gulshan-e-Iqbal Town in Karachi, Sindh, Pakistan
- Gulshan-e-Hadeed, a neighborhood of Bin Qasim Town in Karach, Sindh, Pakistan
- Gulshan-e-Bahar, a neighborhood of New Karachi Town in Karachi, Sindh, Pakistan
- Gulshan-e-Farooq, a neighborhood of New Karachi Town in Karachi, Sindh, Pakistan
- Gulshan-e-Ghazi, a neighborhood of Baldia Town in Karachi, Sindh, Pakistan
- Gulshan-e-Maymar, a neighborhood of Gadap Town in Karachi, Sindh, Pakistan
- Gulshan-e-Mehran, a neighborhood of Korangi Town in Karachi, Sindh, Pakistan
- Gulshan-e-Saeed, a neighborhood of New Karachi Town in Karachi, Sindh, Pakistan
- Gulshan-e-Sheraz, a neighborhood of New Karachi Town in Karachi, Sindh, Pakistan

== Other uses ==
- Gulshan-i 'Ishq, love poem in the Deccani language
- Gulshan-i Raz, collection of 14th century poems
- Gulshan-i Raz-i Jadid, poem by Sir Muhammad Iqbal
- Chahar Gulshan ("Four Gulshans"), 18th century Persian language book about the history of India containing four sections, each called a gulshan

== See also ==
- Gülşen, a given name
- Gulistan (disambiguation)
