= Aliabad-e Enqelab =

Aliabad-e Enqelab (Persian: علي ابادانقلاب) may refer to:

- Aliabad-e Enqelab, Kerman
- Aliabad-e Enqelab, Qom
