= European Film Academy Young Audience Award =

- Country: Europe
- Presented by: European Film Academy
- First award: 2012
- Currently held by: Siblings (2025)
- Website: europeanfilmawards.eu

European Film Academy Young Audience Award has been awarded annually since 2012 by the European Film Academy. EFA presents three European films to 12-14-year-old audiences across Europe.

== Winners and nominees ==
=== 2010s ===
| Year | English Title | Original Title | Director(s) | Country of production |
|---|---|---|---|---|
2012 (25th)
| 2012 (25th) | Kauwboy | | Boudewijn Koole | Netherlands |
| 2012 (25th) | Blue Bird | | Gust Van den Berghe | Belgium, France |
| 2012 (25th) | Sister | L'enfant d'en haut | Ursula Meier | Switzerland, France |
2013 (26th)
| 2013 (26th) | The Zigzag Kid | Nono, het Zigzag Kind | Vincent Bal | Netherlands |
| 2013 (26th) | The Suicide Shop | Le magasin des suicides | Patrice Leconte | France, Belgium, Canada |
| 2013 (26th) | Upside Down | Kopfüber | Bernd Sahling | Germany |
2014 (27th)
| 2014 (27th) | Regret! | Spijt! | Dave Schram | Netherlands |
| 2014 (27th) | The Contest: To the Stars and Back | MGP missionen | Martin Miehe-Renard | Denmark |
| 2014 (27th) | Windstorm | Ostwind - Zusammen sind wir frei | Katja von Garnier | Germany |
2015 (28th)
| 2015 (28th) | The Invisible Boy | Il ragazzo invisibile | Gabriele Salvatores | Italy |
| 2015 (28th) | My Skinny Sister | Min lilla syster | Sanna Lenken | Sweden, Germany |
| 2015 (28th) | You're Ugly Too | | Mark Noonan | Ireland |
2016 (29th)
| 2016 (29th) | Miss Impossible | Jamais contente | Emilie Deleuze | France |
| 2016 (29th) | Girls Lost | Pojkarna | Alexandra-Therese Keining | Sweden, Finland |
| 2016 (29th) | Rauf | | Soner Caner, Baris Kaya | Turkey |
2017 (30th)
| 2017 (30th) | Goodbye Berlin | Tschick | Fatih Akin | Germany |
| 2017 (30th) | My Life as a Zucchini | Ma vie de Courgette | Claude Barras | Switzerland, France |
| 2017 (30th) | The Girl Down Loch Aenzi | Das Mädchen vom Änziloch | Alice Schmid | Switzerland |
2018 (31st)
| 2018 (31st) | Wallay | | Berni Goldblat | France |
| 2018 (31st) | Hobbyhorse Revolution | | Selma Vilhunen | Finland |
| 2018 (31st) | Girl in Flight | La fuga | Sandra Vannucchi | Switzerland, (Italy) |
2019 (32nd)
| 2019 (32nd) | Fight Girl | Vechtmeisje | Johan Timmers | Netherlands Belgium |
| 2019 (32nd) | Los Bando | | Christian Lo | Norway, Sweden |
| 2019 (32nd) | Old Boys | | Toby MacDonald | UK Sweden |

=== 2020s ===
| Year | English Title | Original Title | Director(s) | Country of production |
|---|---|---|---|---|
2020 (33rd)
| 2020 (33rd) | My Brother Chases Dinosaurs | Mio fratello rincorre i dinosauri | Stefano Cipani | Italy Spain |
| 2020 (33rd) | Rocca Changes the World | Rocca verändert die Welt | Katja Benrath | Germany |
| 2020 (33rd) | My Extraordinary Summer with Tess | Mijn bijzonder rare week met Tess | Steven Wouterlood | Netherlands Germany |
2021 (34th)
| 2021 (34th) | The Crossing | Flukten over grensen | Johanne Helgeland | Norway |
| 2021 (34th) | Pinocchio | | Matteo Garrone | Italy, France |
| 2021 (34th) | Wolfwalkers | | Tomm Moore, Ross Stewart | Ireland, Luxembourg |
2022 (35th)
| 2022 (35th) | Animal | | Cyril Dion | France |
| 2022 (35th) | Comedy Queen | | Sanna Lenken | Sweden |
| 2022 (35th) | Dreams Are like Wild Tigers | Träume sind wie wilde Tiger | Lars Montag | Germany |
| 2023 (36th) | Award not given | | | |
| 2024 (37th) | The Remarkable Life of Ibelin | Ibelin | Benjamin Ree | Norway |
| 2024 (37th) | Lars is LOL | Lars er LOL | Eirik Sæter Stordahl | Norway, Denmark |
| 2024 (37th) | Winners | Sieger sein | Soleen Yusef | Germany |
| 2025 (38th) | Siblings | La vita da grandi | Greta Scarano | Italy |
| 2025 (38th) | Arco | | Ugo Bienvenu | France, United States |
| 2025 (38th) | I Accidentally Wrote a Book | Véletlenül írtam egy könyvet | Nóra Lakos | Hungary, Netherlands |
