= 13th Flying Broom International Women's Film Festival =

- Festival Poster
- Location: Ankara, Turkey
- Awards: FIPRESCI Prize; Young Witch Award
- No. of films: 100
- Festival date: May 6–13, 2010
- Website: http://festival.ucansupurge.org/

Flying Broom Film Festival
- 12th

The 13th Flying Broom International Women's Film Festival (Turkish: 13. Uçan Süpürge Kadın Filmleri Festivali) was a film festival held in Ankara, Turkey, which ran from May 6 to 13, 2010.

This edition of the Flying Broom International Women's Film Festival, which was founded in 1997 and is organized by Flying Broom with support from the Çankaya municipality in Ankara and accredited by FIPRESCI, had the theme of evil and focused on the problems of women (including prostitutes, migrant women, poor women and lesbians). The festival opened with a ceremony at the Ankara State Opera and Ballet Hall on May 6, 2010 at which honorary awards were presented to actresses Lale Belkıs and Gülsen Tuncer, and art director Deniz Özen, who attended the special screening of Turkish classic Unmade Bed (Turkish: Dağınık Yatak) directed by Atıf Yılmaz. Among those also in attendance at the ceremony were actresses Hale Soygazi and Deniz Türkali, director Biket İlhan, film critic Sevin Okyay, German director Almut Getto, and American director Nancy Schwartzman.

More than 100 films were screened in 13 programmes at the Kızılırmak cinema, the Ankara Goethe Institute and the Ankara University communication faculty during the festival. A short film competition also under the theme evil, whose winners were to be announced at the opening gala, and a program titled The Other History, dedicated to ignored identities, and featuring four recent Turkish documentaries focusing on identities that have been subjected to 'evil' by being deliberately alienated and ignored were new features of this edition.

The festival closed with an award ceremony and screening of the winning film at the Kızılırmak cinema on May 13, 2010, at which the FIPRESCI jury, consisting of Ceylan Özçelik, Dominique Martinez and Kirsten Liese, awarded the festivals top prize to Home directed by Ursula Meier, and bestowed the Young Witch Award upon Damla Sönmez.

== Awards ==
=== Honour Award ===
- Lale Belkıs (actress, singer and model)

=== Bilge Olgaç Achievement Awards ===
- Deniz Özen (art director)
- Gülsen Tuncer (actress)

=== FIPRESCI Prize ===
- Home directed by Ursula Meier.

=== Young Witch Award ===
- Damla Sönmez (actress)

== Programmes ==
=== Our Cinema ===
- Unmade Bed (Turkish: Dağınık Yatak) directed by Atıf Yılmaz.

=== Evil ===
- Pomegranates and Myrrh(Arabic: المر و الرمان) directed by Najwa Najjar.
- Perfect Love (French: Parfait amour!) directed by Catherine Breillat.
- Ladybird Ladybird directed by Ken Loach.
- Dark Habits (Spanish: Entre tinieblas) directed by Pedro Almodóvar.
- Or (My Treasure) directed by Keren Yedaya.
- Fuck Me (French: Baise-moi) directed by Virginie Despentes and Coralie Trinh Thi.
- Judgement in Stone (French: La Cérémonie) directed by Claude Chabrol.
- Story of Women (French: Une affaire de femmes) directed by Claude Chabrol.

=== Each Has a Different Colour ===
- 10 to 11 (Turkish: 11'e 10 Kala) directed by Pelin Esmer.
- Amreeka directed by Cherien Dabis.
- Between Us (Spanish: Entre nos) directed by Paola Mendoza and Gloria La Morte.
- She, a Chinese directed by Xiaolu Guo.
- Can Go Through Skin (Dutch: Kan door huid heen) directed by Esther Rots.
- Women Without Men directed by Shirin Neshat.
- Winter Silence (German: Winterstilte) directed by Sonja Wyss.
- Men on the Bridge (Turkish: Köprüdekiler) directed by İlksen Başarır.
- Lourdes directed by Jessica Hausner.
- Five Days Without Nora (Spanish: Cinco días sin Nora) directed by Mariana Chenillo.
- Close to You (German: Ganz nah bei Dir) directed by Almut Getto.
- My Year Without Sex directed by Sarah Watt.
- Home directed by Ursula Meier.

=== Golden Girls ===
- White Material directed by Claire Denis.
- Bright Star directed by Jane Campion.

=== Signe Baumane Retrospective ===
- Love Story directed by Signe Baumane.
- The Witch and the Cow directed by Signe Baumane.
- Teat Beat Of Sex directed by Signe Baumane.
- Birth directed by Signe Baumane.
- The Very First Desire directed by Signe Baumane.
- Tiny Shoes directed by Signe Baumane.
- Natasha directed by Signe Baumane.
- Signe and... directed by Signe Baumane.

=== Made in Europe ===
- Adoption (Hungarian: Örökbefogadás) directed by Márta Mészáros.
- Take My Eyes (Spanish: Te doy mis ojos) directed by Icíar Bollaín.
- Nothing (Polish: Nic) directed by Dorota Kędzierzawska.
- Broken Mirrors (Dutch: Gebroken spiegels) directed by Marleen Gorris.
- Morvern Callar directed by Lynne Ramsay.
- Struggle directed by Ruth Mader.
- A Common Thread (French: Brodeuses) directed by Éléonore Faucher.

=== The Best... ===
- The Day I Became A Woman (Persian: روزی که زن شدم) directed by Marziyeh Meshkini.
- The Piano directed by Jane Campion.

=== The Other History ===
- Children of September (Turkish: Eylül Çocukları) directed by Hülya Karcı and Meltem Öztürk.
- Brush Stroke (Turkish: Fırça Darbesi) directed by Nihan Belgin.
- Two Wisps of Hair: The Missing Girls of Dersim (Turkish: İki Tutam Saç: Dersim'in Kayıp Kızları) directed by Nezahat Gündoğan.
- Hush! (Turkish: Nahide'nin Türküsü) directed by Berke Baş.
- Voices (Turkish: Sesler) directed by Filiz Işık Bulut.

== See also ==
- 2010 in film
- Turkish films of 2010
