= Kahyaz =

Village in Isfahan province, Iran

Kahyaz Persian: كهياز
- Village
- Location within Iran
- Coordinates: 33°11′29″N 52°46′11″E
- Country: Iran
- Province: Isfahan
- County: Ardestan
- District: Zavareh
- Rural District: Sofla

Population (2016)
  - Total: 46
- Time zone: UTC+3:30 (IRST)

Kahyaz (Persian: كهياز) (Note: Also romanized as Kahyāz; also known as Mahyāz, Qahyāz, and Qehyāz) is a village in Sofla Rural District of Zavareh District in Ardestan County, Isfahan province, Iran.

== Demographics ==
=== Population ===
At the time of the 2006 National Census, the village's population was 54 in 20 households. The following census in 2011 counted a population below the reporting threshold. The 2016 census measured the population of the village as 46 people in 34 households.
