= Amirabad, Ardestan =

Village in Isfahan province, Iran

Amirabad Persian: اميراباد
- Village
- Location within Iran
- Coordinates: 33°27′30″N 52°38′00″E
- Country: Iran
- Province: Isfahan
- County: Ardestan
- District: Zavareh
- Rural District: Rigestan

Population (2016)
  - Total: 116
- Time zone: UTC+3:30 (IRST)

Amirabad (Persian: اميراباد) (Note: Also romanized as Amīrābād) is a village in Rigestan Rural District of Zavareh District in Ardestan County, Isfahan province, Iran.

== Demographics ==
=== Population ===
At the time of the 2006 National Census, the village's population was 51 in 20 households. The following census in 2011 counted 133 people in 44 households. The 2016 census measured the population of the village as 116 people in 40 households.
