= Shahrab, Isfahan =

Village in Isfahan province, Iran

Shahrab Persian: شهراب
- Village
- Location within Iran
- Coordinates: 33°19′49″N 52°48′32″E
- Country: Iran
- Province: Isfahan
- County: Ardestan
- District: Zavareh
- Rural District: Sofla

Population (2016)
  - Total: 70
- Time zone: UTC+3:30 (IRST)

Shahrab (Persian: شهراب) (Note: Also romanized as Shahrāb; also known as Sarāb) is a village in, and the capital of, Sofla Rural District in Zavareh District of Ardestan County, Isfahan province, Iran.

== Demographics ==
=== Population ===
At the time of the 2006 National Census, the village's population was 173 in 71 households. The following census in 2011 counted 54 people in 30 households. The 2016 census measured the population of the village as 70 people in 42 households.
