= Telkabad =

Village in Isfahan province, Iran

Telkabad Persian: تلک‌آباد
- Village
- Location within Iran
- Coordinates: 33°27′59″N 52°27′19″E
- Country: Iran
- Province: Isfahan
- County: Ardestan
- District: Zavareh
- Rural District: Rigestan

Population (2016)
  - Total: 1,469
- Time zone: UTC+3:30 (IRST)

Telkabad (Persian: تلک‌آباد) (Note: Also romanized as Telkābād and Tolkābād) is a village in, and the capital of, Rigestan Rural District in Zavareh District of Ardestan County, Isfahan province, Iran.

== Demographics ==
=== Population ===
At the time of the 2006 National Census, the village's population was 1,422 in 361 households. The following census in 2011 counted 1,379 people in 405 households. The 2016 census measured the population of the village as 1,469 people in 448 households. It was the most populous village in its rural district.
