= Kochur Sotaq =

Village in Isfahan province, Iran

Kochur Sotaq Persian: كچورستاق
- Village
- Location within Iran
- Coordinates: 33°28′00″N 52°23′40″E
- Country: Iran
- Province: Isfahan
- County: Ardestan
- District: Zavareh
- Rural District: Rigestan

Population (2016)
  - Total: 472
- Time zone: UTC+3:30 (IRST)

Kochur Sotaq (Persian: كچورستاق) (Note: Also romanized as Kachū Rostāq, Kachūrestāq, and Kochūr Sotāq) is a village in Rigestan Rural District of Zavareh District in Ardestan County, Isfahan province, Iran.

== Demographics ==
=== Population ===
At the time of the 2006 National Census, the village's population was 554 in 136 households. The following census in 2011 counted 497 people in 138 households. The 2016 census measured the population of the village as 472 people in 147 households.
