= Gülşen =

Gülşen or Gülsen is a feminine given name and surname of Turkish origin. It comes from the Persian word Golshan/گلشن, which means place of flowers. Notable people with the name include:

== Given name ==
=== Gülsen ===
- Gülsen Bozkurt (born 1950), Turkish Cypriot doctor and politician
- Gülsen Demirtürk (born 2000), Turkish karateka
- Gülsen Tuncer (1945–2026), Turkish actress

=== Gülşen ===
- Gülşen (singer) (born 1976), Turkish singer-songwriter
- Gülşen Aktaş (born 1957), Turkish schoolteacher and political scientist
- Gülşen Bubikoğlu (born 1954), Turkish actress
- Gülşen Degener (born 1968), Turkish carom billiards player
- Gülşen Orhan (born 1970), Turkish archeologist and politician
- Gülşen Samancı (born 2000), Turkish swimmer

== Surname ==
- Elif Gülşen (born 1998), Turkish judoka

== See also ==
- Gulshan (disambiguation)
