= Golestan-e Shahid Rejai =

Golestan-e Shahid Rejai گلستان شهيدرجائي
- Village
- Country: Iran
- Province: Isfahan
- County: Ardestan
- Bakhsh: Zavareh
- Rural District: Rigestan

Population (2006)
  - Total: 101
- Time zone: UTC+3:30 (IRST)
  - Summer (DST): UTC+4:30 (IRDT)

Golestan-e Shahid Rejai (Persian: گلستان شهيدرجائي, also Romanized as Golestān-e Shahīd Rejā’ī) is a village in Rigestan Rural District, Zavareh District, Ardestan County, Isfahan Province, Iran. At the 2006 census, its population was 101, in 30 families.
