= Keep Going (disambiguation) =

Keep Going is a 2018 film by Joachim Lafosse. It may also refer to:

- "Keep Going", a 2015 song by Rachael Yamagata
- "Keep Going", a 2019 song by Syn Cole
- "Keep Going", a 2008 song by T-Pain from Three Ringz
- "Keep Going", a 2009 song by Taio Cruz from Rokstarr
- Keep Going, a 2020 album by Larry June and Harry Fraud
- Keep Going, a 2014 album by Pakho Chau
- Keep Going, a 2003 album by Stephen Duffy & The Lilac Time
- Keep Going, a 2019 mixtape by Mike Posner
