= Dehabad =

Dehabad or Dahabad (Persian: ده اباد) may refer to:

- Dehabad, Ardestan
- Dehabad, Natanz
