= Sofla Rural District =

Sofla Rural District (Persian: دهستان سفلي) may refer to:

- Sofla Rural District (Fars Province)
- Sofla Rural District (Isfahan Province)
