= Golzar-e Mohammad =

Village in Isfahan province, Iran

Golzar-e Mohammad Persian: گلزارمحمد
- Village
- Location within Iran
- Coordinates: 33°29′54″N 52°20′50″E
- Country: Iran
- Province: Isfahan
- County: Ardestan
- District: Zavareh
- Rural District: Rigestan

Population (2016)
  - Total: 118
- Time zone: UTC+3:30 (IRST)

Golzar-e Mohammad (Persian: گلزارمحمد) (Note: Also romanized as Golzār-e Moḩammad) is a village in Rigestan Rural District of Zavareh District in Ardestan County, Isfahan province, Iran.

== Demographics ==
=== Population ===
At the time of the 2006 National Census, the village's population was 123 in 30 households. The following census in 2011 counted 107 people in 27 households. The 2016 census measured the population of the village as 118 people in 39 households.
