= The Suicide Shop (film) =

2012 French animated film directed by Patrice Leconte

- Film poster
- Directed by: Patrice Leconte
- Written by: Patrice Leconte
- Based on: The Suicide Shop by Jean Teulé
- Produced by: Gilles Podesta; Thomas Langmann; André Rouleau
- Edited by: Rodolphe Ploquin
- Music by: Étienne Perruchon
- Distributed by: ARP Sélection (France)
- Release dates: 24 May 2012 (Cannes); 26 September 2012 (France & Belgium)
- Running time: 79 minutes
- Countries: France; Canada; Belgium
- Language: French
- Budget: €9.9 million
- Box office: $2.5 million

The Suicide Shop (French: Le Magasin des suicides) is a 2012 French adult animated musical comedy film written and directed by Patrice Leconte and is based on Jean Teule's novel of the same name.

It was released on 16 May 2012 in France. As with the source material, it centers on an undepressed child born into a proprietorial family that runs a shop that sells suicide adjuncts in a dilapidated, near-future city.

== Plot ==
In a gloomy French city with a high suicide rate is a shop where customers can find everything necessary to efficiently commit suicide in whatever manner they wish. The shop has been run by the Tuvache family, which consists of two apathetic children, Vincent and Marilyn, and their parents, who keep the business running. Things are going great until Lucrèce Tuvache, the mother, gives birth to her third child, Alan. Even as a baby, he can't help but smile and find happiness in everything he sees. Unfortunately for the business, his bubbly personality starts to affect the customers. Mishima, Alan's father, starts to grow tired of Alan's personality and gives him a pack of cigarettes in hopes that it'll kill him faster. Mishima's mental state slowly deteriorates as Alan starts to make him feel guilty for his customers' deaths. He later winds up attempting suicide and is sent to a therapist who claims he's schizophrenic. He's forced to stay in bed for two weeks while Alan and his classmates start to stop the customers from committing suicide. Though Marilyn and the mother are warming up to him, Alan is still proving to be problematic to the business as he asks his friend's uncle to build a car with a music center so loud that it shakes all the supplies in the shop off the shelves and onto the floor where they'll break. Though Vincent shuts off the car as soon as he can, the damage has already been done. Alan gets scolded by his mother, however, a young boy who was there as a customer has met and fallen in love with Marilyn and proposed to her then and there. As Marilyn agrees to marry him, the mother feels grateful that Alan did what he did. Everyone, including Vincent, is finally happy. The new fiancé bakes crepes for the family and, attracted by the smell of them, Mishima awakes and comes out of his bedroom. He angrily demands an explanation for the wreckage of their shop to which Alan admits to causing. Mishima is furious and chases after him with a sword in hand. On a roof of a skyscraper, Alan fakes suicide, throwing himself off the building. The family despairs until Alan bounces back up from the jump after landing on a sheet his friends were holding, making his father laugh for the very first time. The suicide shop becomes a crèpes shop, but Mishima secretly sells cyanide crèpes for those who still long for death.

== Voice cast ==
- Bernard Alane as Mishima Tuvache, the father
- Isabelle Spade as Lucrèce Tuvache, the mother
- Kacey Mottet Klein as Alan Tuvache, the son
- Isabelle Giam as Marilyn, the daughter
- Laurent Gendron as Vincent, the son
- Pierre-François Martin-Laval as the handsome boy
- Eric Métayer as psychiatrist / the tramp
- Jacques Mathou as Mr Calmel / Mr Dead-For-Two
- Urbain Cancelier as the doctor / Neurasthenia
- Pascal Parmentier as Uncle Dom / the gymnastics instructor
- Edouard Prettet as the melancholia
- Jean-Paul Comart as the guard / the bridges suicidal
- Nathalie Perrot as the little woman n°1
- Annick Alane as the old little woman / the little woman n°2
- Juliette Poissonnier as Ms Dead-For-Two / the woman
- Philippe du Janerand as the fever man/ the spouse

== Reception ==
Review aggregation website Rotten Tomatoes reported an approval rating of 71%, based on 7 reviews, with an average score of 6.5/10.

== Accolades ==
Award / Film Festival	Category	Recipients and nominees	Result
European Film Awards	Young Audience Award		Nominated
