= Sahruyeh =

Village in Isfahan province, Iran

Sahruyeh Persian: سهرويه
- Village
- Location within Iran
- Country: Iran
- Province: Isfahan
- County: Ardestan
- District: Zavareh
- Rural District: Sofla

Population (2016)
  - Total: Below reporting threshold
- Time zone: UTC+3:30 (IRST)

Sahruyeh (Persian: سهرويه) (Note: Also romanized as Sahrūyeh; also known as Sohrū‘īyeh) is a village in Sofla Rural District of Zavareh District in Ardestan County, Isfahan province, Iran.

== Demographics ==
=== Population ===
At the time of the 2006 National Census, the village's population was nine in five households, when it was in Kachu Rural District of the Central District. The following censuses in 2011 and 2016 counted a population below the reporting threshold.

In 2023, the village was transferred to Sofla Rural District in Zavareh District.
