= Talabad =

Talabad or Tallabad (Persian: تل اباد) may refer to:

- Tallabad, Isfahan
- Talabad, Kashmar
