= Amiran =

Village in Isfahan province, Iran

Amiran Persian: اميران
- Village
- Location within Iran
- Coordinates: 33°27′47″N 52°24′14″E
- Country: Iran
- Province: Isfahan
- County: Ardestan
- District: Zavareh
- Rural District: Rigestan

Population (2016)
  - Total: 703
- Time zone: UTC+3:30 (IRST)

Amiran (Persian: اميران) (Note: Also romanized as Amīrān; also known as Omehrān) is a village in Rigestan Rural District of Zavareh District in Ardestan County, Isfahan province, Iran.

== Demographics ==
=== Population ===
At the time of the 2006 National Census, the village's population was 673 in 180 households. The following census in 2011 counted 750 people in 229 households. The 2016 census measured the population of the village as 703 people in 225 households.
