= Ahmadabad, Ardestan =

Village in Isfahan province, Iran

Ahmadabad Persian: احمداباد
- Village
- Location within Iran
- Coordinates: 33°29′22″N 52°20′36″E
- Country: Iran
- Province: Isfahan
- County: Ardestan
- District: Zavareh
- Rural District: Rigestan

Population (2016)
  - Total: 128
- Time zone: UTC+3:30 (IRST)

Ahmadabad (Persian: احمداباد) (Note: Also romanized as Aḩmadābād) is a village in Rigestan Rural District of Zavareh District in Ardestan County, Isfahan province, Iran.

== Demographics ==
=== Population ===
At the time of the 2006 National Census, the village's population was 146 in 38 households. The following census in 2011 counted 99 people in 27 households. The 2016 census measured the population of the village as 128 people in 41 households.
