= Sepideh, Iran =

Village in Isfahan province, Iran

Sepideh Persian: سپيده
- Village
- Location within Iran
- Coordinates: 33°19′16″N 52°47′04″E
- Country: Iran
- Province: Isfahan
- County: Ardestan
- District: Zavareh
- Rural District: Sofla

Population (2016)
  - Total: 74
- Time zone: UTC+3:30 (IRST)

Sepideh (Persian: سپيده) (Note: Also romanized as Sepīdeh; also known as Sefīdeh) is a village in Sofla Rural District of Zavareh District in Ardestan County, Isfahan province, Iran.

== Demographics ==
=== Population ===
At the time of the 2006 National Census, the village's population was 213 in 87 households. The following census in 2011 counted 250 people in 73 households. The 2016 census measured the population of the village as 74 people in 37 households. It was the most populous village in its rural district.
