= Mozdabad-e Bala =

Village in Isfahan province, Iran

Mozdabad-e Bala Persian: مَزدآباد بالا
- Village
- Location within Iran
- Coordinates: 33°20′09″N 52°34′32″E
- Country: Iran
- Province: Isfahan
- County: Ardestan
- District: Zavareh
- Rural District: Sofla

Population (2016)
  - Total: 44
- Time zone: UTC+3:30 (IRST)

Mozdabad-e Bala (Persian: مزدابادبالا) (Note: Also romanized as Mazdabad-e Bala, Mazdābād-e Bālā, and Mozdābād-e Bālā; also known as Mozdābād and Muzdābād) is a village in Sofla Rural District of Zavareh District in Ardestan County, Isfahan province, Iran.

== Demographics ==
=== Population ===
At the time of the 2006 National Census, the village's population was 62 in 18 households, when it was in Kachu Rural District of the Central District. The following census in 2011 counted 60 people in 20 households. The 2016 census measured the population of the village as 44 people in 20 households.

In 2023, the village was transferred to Sofla Rural District in Zavareh District.
