= Sianak-e Pain =

Village in Isfahan province, Iran

Sianak-e Pain Persian: سیانک پایین
- Village
- Location within Iran
- Country: Iran
- Province: Isfahan
- County: Ardestan
- District: Zavareh
- Rural District: Sofla

Population (2016)
  - Total: 41
- Time zone: UTC+3:30 (IRST)

Sianak-e Pain (Persian: سیانک پایین) (Note: Also romanized as Sīānak-e Pā’īn; also known as Seyānak-e Soflá and Sīyānak) is a village in Sofla Rural District of Zavareh District in Ardestan County, Isfahan province, Iran.

== Demographics ==
=== Population ===
At the time of the 2006 National Census, the village's population was 13 in nine households. The following census in 2011 counted 74 people in 35 households. The 2016 census measured the population of the village as 41 people in 25 households.
