= Jean Teulé =

French novelist (1953–2022)

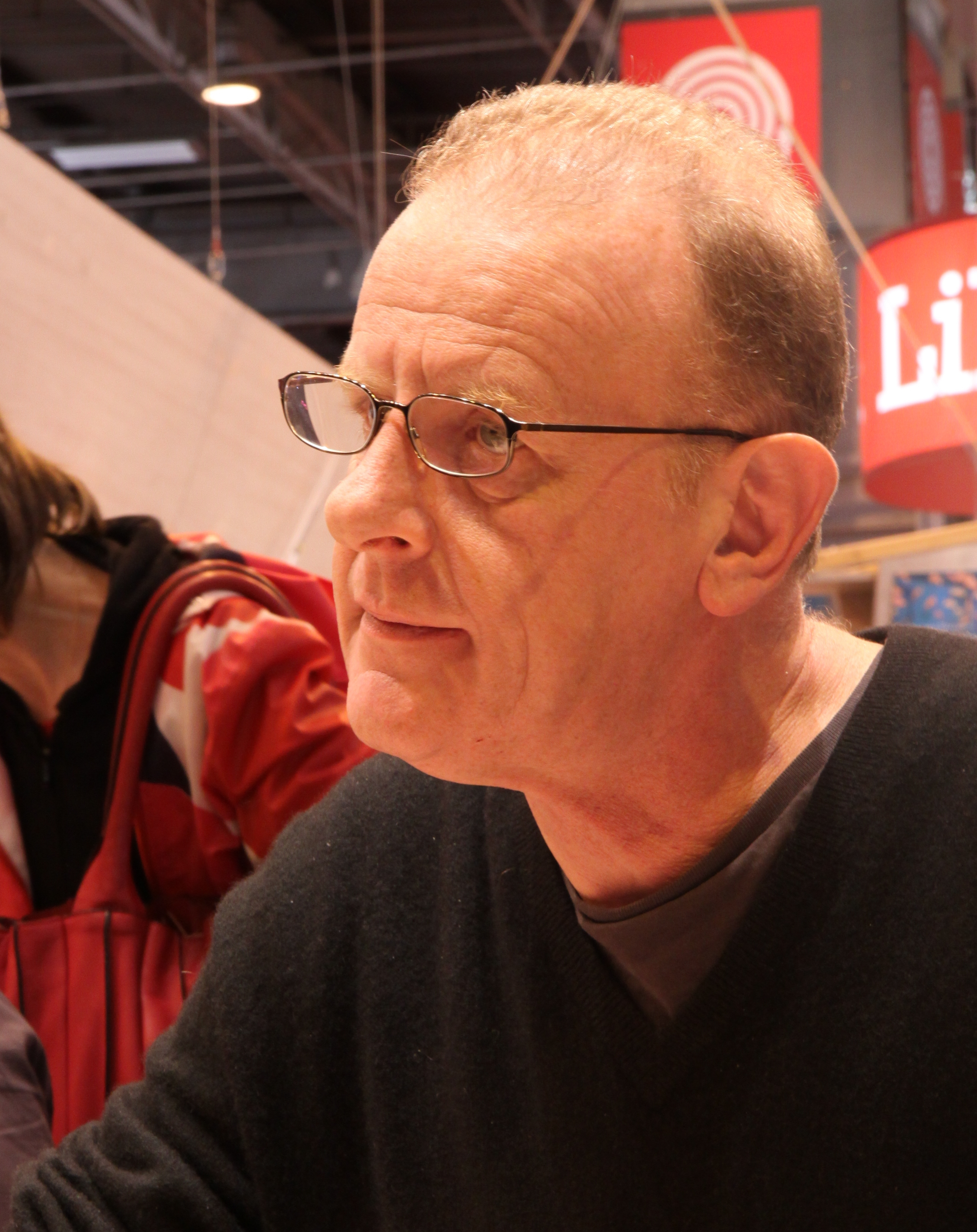
- Teulé in 2010
- Born: 26 February 1953; Saint-Lô, Manche, France
- Died: 18 October 2022 (aged 69); Paris, France
- Occupations: Novelist, cartoonist, screenwriter

Jean Teulé (French pronunciation: [ʒɑ̃ tøle]; 26 February 1953 – 18 October 2022) was a French novelist, cartoonist and screenwriter. He was the partner of actress Miou-Miou.

Teulé’s book Le magasin des suicides (The Suicide Shop), published in 2007, has been turned into a film called The Suicide Shop. It screened at the Newport Beach Film Festival in Newport Beach, California, on 28 April 2013 and 2 May 2013.

Teulé died from a cardiac arrest on 18 October 2022, at the age of 69.

== Works ==
Books

- Bloody Mary, plot by Jean Vautrin, Glénat, 1984
- Filles de nuit, Glénat, 1985
- Sita-Java, plot by Gourio, Glénat, 1986
- Gens de France, Casterman, 1988
- Zazou !, Comixland, 1988
- Gens d'ailleurs, Casterman, 1993 (two volume reissue of the one volume Gens de France et d'ailleurs by Ego comme X in 2005)
- Rainbow pour Rimbaud, Éditions Julliard, 1991
- L'Œil de Pâques, Éditions Julliard, 1992
- Ballade pour un père oublié, Éditions Julliard, 1995
- Darling, Éditions Julliard, 1998
- Bord cadre, Éditions Julliard, 1999
- Longues Peines, Éditions Julliard, 2001)
- Les Lois de la gravité, Éditions Julliard, 2003
- Ô Verlaine !, Éditions Julliard, 2004
- Je, François Villon, Éditions Julliard, 2006
- Le magasin des suicides, Éditions Julliard, 2007. Tr. The Suicide Shop London: Gallic (2008).
- Le Montespan, Éditions Julliard, 2008, Pocket 2009. Grand Prix Palatine du roman historique, prix Maison de la Presse 2008. Tr. Monsieur Montespan: London: Gallic (2011).
- Mangez-le si vous voulez, Éditions Julliard, 2009. Tr. Eat Him If You Like London: Gallic (2011).
- Charly 9, Julliard, 2011.
- Fleur de tonnerre, Julliard, 2013.
- Héloïse ouille !, Julliard, 2015.
- Plot of Je voudrais me suicider mais j'ai pas le temps, (drawings by Florence Cestac), éd. Dargaud, 2009, biography of Charlie Schlingo.
- Azincourt par temps de pluie, Mialet-Barrault éditeurs, 2022.

Filmography

- 1996 : Rainbow pour Rimbaud, director and writer
- 1997 : Romaine, actor
- 2005 : Caché, actor
- 2007 : Darling, adaptation of his novel
