= Golestan-e Mehdi =

Village in Isfahan province, Iran

Golestan-e Mehdi Persian: گلستان مهدی
- Village
- Location within Iran
- Coordinates: 33°29′11″N 52°20′06″E
- Country: Iran
- Province: Isfahan
- County: Ardestan
- District: Zavareh
- Rural District: Rigestan

Population (2016)
  - Total: 114
- Time zone: UTC+3:30 (IRST)

Golestan-e Mehdi (Persian: گلستان مهدی) (Note: Also romanized as Golestān-e Mehdī) is a village in Rigestan Rural District of Zavareh District in Ardestan County, Isfahan province, Iran.

== Demographics ==
=== Population ===
At the time of the 2006 National Census, the village's population was 122 in 32 households. The following census in 2011 counted 138 people in 41 households. The 2016 census measured the population of the village as 114 people in 42 households.
