= Gulshan Khan =

South African photographer

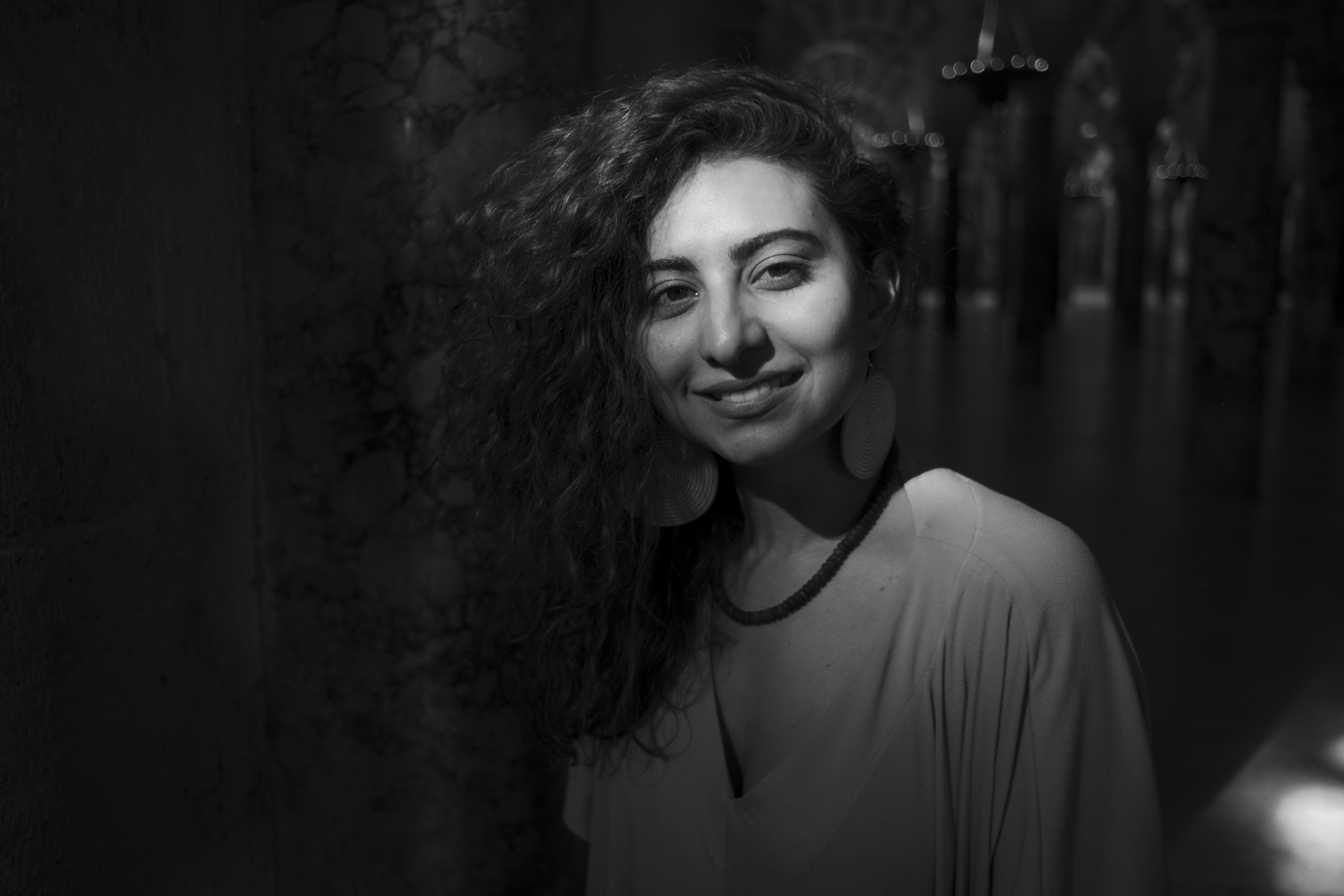
- South African photographer Gulshan Khan
- Born: 1983 (age 42–43); Ladysmith, South Africa
- Occupation: Photographer
- Notable work: The Things We Carry With Us (2018)

Gulshan Khan is an independent South African photographer based in Johannesburg. Noted for her photojournalism work focused on social justice identity and human rights development, Khan's work engages in multi-layered themes around the mediatized representations of identities in South Africa which inform her visual practice.

== Early life ==
Khan was born in 1983. She was raised in Ladysmith, Kwazulu Natal, one of two siblings, she hails from a family rooted in activism and community work.

== Career ==
A graduate of the Market Photo Workshop Photojournalism and Documentary Photography (PDP) program she first published with Agence France Presse in 2016, where she subsequently did a month long internship. The first African woman to be assigned by Agence France Presse in 2017, she continued to work for the agency as a stringer while also working on assignments for various international publications and organisations. Her first body of long-term documentary work The Things We Carry With Us (2017) explores the contemporary community of Muslims in South Africa, developing a more nuanced view on the backdrop of the oppressive legacy of apartheid South Africa. Khan was invited to speak about the political motivation to document the human condition, and the importance of photography to speak about dignity, identity and belonging, social justice and human rights in South Africa and globally at the 2020 National Geographic Storytellers Summit 2020.

Khan was one of six photographers selected for the World Press Photo 6x6 Talent Programme: Africa Edition. A panelist at the World Press Photo Festival 2019, Khan presented work and participated in a talk on The Impact of the story on the individual which addressed the effects that images can have on the lives of the vulnerable individuals in the media landscape as well as issues of ethics, permissions and responsibility of photographers, editors, publishers and other visual practitioners.

Extracts of her projects The Things We Carry With Us (2017) as well as Life in Plastic (2018) have been acquired by the Iziko South African National Gallery as part of the South African national archive. Her work was included in the first edition of the "Four to Follow" series which was established in 2017 by World Press Photo, drawing from the African Photojournalism Database as well as the 2018 Top 100 images from the editors of Time. Khan's photojournalism work is published widely in international news publications, among others The New York Times, The Washington Post, New Frame, The Guardian, Al Jazeera, The Wall Street Journal.

She has worked with various NGO's including the United Nations Population Fund (UNFPA), the Swiss Agency for Development and Cooperation (SDC) and the African Women's Development Fund.

Khan forms part of a new generation of contemporary South African photographers documenting the legacies of a post-apartheid land. She is a National Geographic Explorer, an Everyday Africa contributor, a member of Women Photograph and Native.

== Exhibitions ==
- Everyday Africa, World Press Photo - Schloss Oldenburg, Oldenburg, Germany, Feb 2020
- Native Agency, Territory, Grün Berlin, Berlin, Germany, August 2019
- Photoville L.A. - MFON: Alter Prayer, Ritual and Offerings Los Angeles, May 2019
- Bronx Documentary Centre - Transitions: South Africa, New York City, Apr 2019
- Not the usual suspects - Iziko South African National Gallery, Cape Town, Oct 2018
- Johannesburg Art Galery, Art Market Budapest, Budapest, Oct 2018
- Unstill Life, Photo Kathmandu, Nepal, Oct 2018
- World Press Photo 6x6 Talent Africa Exhibition, Kutching, Malaysia, Sept 2018
- “Foreseen: New Narratives from the African Photojournalism Database” - Nuku Photo Festival, Ghana, Sept 2018
- Photoville NYC - Foreseen: New Narratives APJD, New York City, Sept 2018
- Photoville NYC MFON: Altar Prayer, Ritual and Offerings, New York City, Sept 2018
- ‘Foreseen' World Press Photo / APJD - LUMIX - Festival for young Photojournalism, June 2018
- [CROP] Project (Creative Resistance & Open Processes), Johannesburg, Nov 2017
