= Shock Waves (TV series) =

Swiss television series

- Ondes de choc
- Genre: Drama anthology
- Original language: French
- No. of episodes: 4

Original release
- Network: Radio Télévision Suisse
- Release: 13 July – 20 July 2018

Shock Waves (French: Ondes de choc) is a Swiss television drama anthology series, broadcast by Radio Télévision Suisse in 2018. The series consisted of four television films dramatizing true crime stories from European history.

The episodes premiered theatrically at the Solothurn Film Festival in February 2018, and two episodes of the series, Diary of My Mind and First Name: Mathieu, received theatrical screenings in the Panorama section at the 68th Berlin International Film Festival, prior to their television premieres in July. All four episodes were later screened at the 2018 Vancouver International Film Festival.

== Episodes ==
No.	Title	Directed by	Written by	Original release date
1	"Diary of My Mind (French: Journal de ma tête)"	Ursula Meier	Antoine Jaccoud, Ursula Meier	July 13, 2018
Madame Fontanel (Fanny Ardant), a school teacher, must confront the effects of having been made an unwitting accomplice to a murder committed by her student Benjamin (Kacey Mottet Klein), when he confesses to the murder and his motivations in a homework assignment he turned in to her just before committing the crime.
2	"Sirius"	Frédéric Mermoud	François Decodts, Laurent Larivière, Frédéric Mermoud	July 13, 2018
Based on the Order of the Solar Temple fires at Salvan in 1994, a cult prepares for a mass ritual suicide.
3	"First Name: Mathieu (French: Prénom: Mathieu)"	Lionel Baier	Lionel Baier	July 20, 2018
Based on the real life case of serial killer Michel Peiry, teenager Mathieu (Maxime Gorbatchevsky) copes with being the sole survivor of a serial killer after being kidnapped and raped but escaping.
4	"The Valley (French: La Vallée)"	Jean-Stéphane Bron	Jean-Stéphane Bron, Alice Winocour	July 20, 2018
Riyad (Ilies Kadri) tries to outrun the police in a valley, after a failed attempt at car theft.
