= Home (2008 Swiss film) =

2008 film

- Film poster
- Directed by: Ursula Meier
- Written by: Ursula Meier; Antoine Jaccoud
- Produced by: Denis Delcampe
- Starring: Isabelle Huppert; Olivier Gourmet
- Cinematography: Agnès Godard
- Edited by: Susana Rossberg
- Production companies: Box Productions; Archipel 35; Need Productions; France 3 Cinéma
- Distributed by: Filmcoopi Zürich AG (Switzerland); Diaphana Films (France)
- Release dates: 18 May 2008 (Cannes); 29 October 2008 (France)
- Running time: 98 minutes
- Countries: Switzerland; France; Belgium
- Language: French
- Budget: €5.7 million
- Box office: $2.5 million

Home is a 2008 Swiss drama film directed by Ursula Meier, starring Isabelle Huppert and Olivier Gourmet. The film was the official Swiss submission for Best Foreign Language Film at the 82nd Academy Awards, but was not nominated.

== Plot ==
Marthe (Isabelle Huppert) and Michel (Olivier Gourmet) live with their three children in a house next to an uncompleted highway. They use the deserted road as a recreation area. For example, they put an inflatable swimming pool on it and the son and his friends use the highway to ride their bicycles. As it has been ten years since the highway was abandoned, they believe that it will not be completed. One day, without warning, construction workers begin to upgrade the road and the highway opens to traffic. Despite noise from passing traffic, the family remains in the house. Previously, the father would simply walk across the highway in order to access his car to get to work. This becomes harder as the highway becomes busier. He and his children eventually have to use a tunnel in order to access the outside world.

Their younger daughter, Marion (Madeleine Budd), becomes obsessed about the quality and cleanliness of her surroundings. She monitors the grass as it exhibits the effects of carbon monoxide emissions and is convinced that the family may fall ill or even die prematurely, as a consequence of living in such close proximity to the highway. The elder daughter, Judith (Adélaïde Leroux), continues to sunbathe on the front lawn, despite attracting unwanted attention from passing motorists.

One day, Judith decides to leave home without telling her family. Returning after a period of time, being driven by a man, she finds the house bricked-up and, after an unsuccessful attempt to find an entrance, leaves again. In her absence, Michel had attempted to leave with the remaining children, but Marthe refused to depart. The family then decided to sound-proof the house, which included blocking up all the windows and sealing all the ventilation points. Confined, the pressure begins to take its toll and, in what appears to be a death dream, Marthe breaks open a wall and the family exits the house into the sunlit outdoors.

== Cast ==
- Isabelle Huppert as Marthe
- Olivier Gourmet as Michel
- Adélaïde Leroux as Judith
- Madeleine Budd as Marion
- Kacey Mottet Klein as Julien

== Production ==
Director Ursula Meier searched for a suitable location across Europe, before finding a spot in Bulgaria. The road itself was already under construction and they then built the house next to the then-unused road. Meier wrote the script specifically for Isabelle Huppert before she was cast. Huppert was given the script while she was in Belgium, working on Joachim Lafosse's film Private Property.

== Reception ==
=== Critical response ===
Metacritic, which assigns a rating out of 100 to reviews from mainstream critics, reported an average score of 67, based on 12 reviews, indicating "generally favorable reviews".

=== Accolades ===
Award / Film Festival	Category	Recipients and nominees	Result
Bratislava International Film Festival	Grand Prix	Ursula Meier	Nominated
César Award	Best Cinematography	Agnès Godard	Nominated
César Award	Best First Feature Film	Ursula Meier	Nominated
César Award	Best Production Design	Ivan Niclass	Nominated
Flying Broom Women's Film Festival	FIPRESCI Award	Ursula Meier	Won
Lumière Awards	Best Cinematography	Agnès Godard	Won
Mar del Plata Film Festival	Best Actress	Isabelle Huppert	Won
Mar del Plata Film Festival	ADF Cinematography Award	Agnès Godard	Won
Mar del Plata Film Festival	Best Film	Ursula Meier	Nominated
Reykjavík International Film Festival	FIPRESCI Award	Ursula Meier	Won
Swiss Film Prize	Best Emerging Actor or Actress	Kacey Mottet Klein	Won
Swiss Film Prize	Best Film	Ursula Meier	Won
Swiss Film Prize	Best Screenplay	Ursula Meier and Antoine Jaccoud	Won

== See also ==
- Isabelle Huppert on screen and stage
