= Kacey Mottet Klein =

Swiss actor

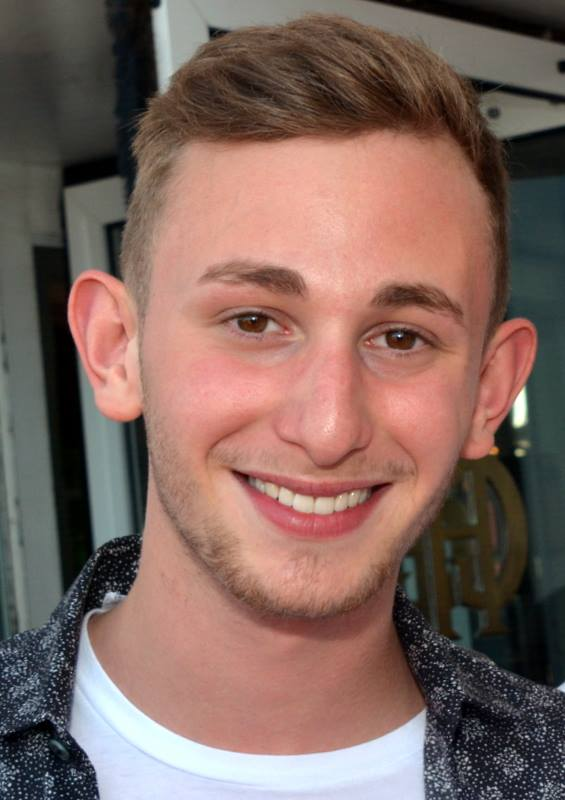
- Kacey Mottet Klein at the Cabourg Film Festival in 2016
- Born: 20 October 1998 (age 27); Lausanne, Switzerland
- Occupation: Actor
- Years active: 2008–present

Kacey Mottet Klein (born 20 October 1998) is a Swiss actor.

== Life and career ==
Kacey Mottet Klein was born in Lausanne to an American father and a Swiss mother. He made his screen debut in 2008, in Ursula Meier's Home, for which he won the Swiss Film Award for Best Emerging Actor. In 2012, he appeared in the film Sister, which was his second collaboration with director Ursula Meier. His performance won him another Swiss Film Award and also a nomination for the César Award for Most Promising Actor. In 2016, he was given the Shooting Stars Award at the Berlin International Film Festival.

== Filmography ==
Year	Title	Role	Notes
2008	Home	Julien	Swiss Film Award for Best Emerging Actor
2010	Gainsbourg: A Heroic Life	Young Serge Gainsbourg	
2012	Sister	Simon	Hawaii International Film Festival - EuroCinema Hawai`i Award for Best Actor; Swiss Film Award for Best Actor; Nominated—César Award for Most Promising Actor
2012	The Suicide Shop	Alan Tuvache	Voice
2013	Cadrage débordement	Rico	Short
2014	Le Mauvais fils	Antoine	Short
2014	Gemma Bovery	Julien Joubert	
2015	Une mère	Guillaume	
2015	Keeper	Maxime	
2015	Les Guerriers	Thomas	Short
2016	Being 17	Damien	Nominated—César Award for Most Promising Actor; Nominated—Lumière Award for Best Male Revelation; Cabourg Film Festival - Male Revelation
2017	The Royal Exchange	Don Luis	
2018	Shock Waves – Diary of My Mind	Benjamin	
2018	Keep Going	Samuel	
2021	Happening	Jean	
2023	The Vourdalak	Marquis d’Urfe	
2025	The Sentinels	De Clermont	
