= Baqerabad, Jafarabad =

Village in Qom province, Iran

Baqerabad Persian: باقراباد
- Village
- Location within Iran
- Coordinates: 34°48′01″N 50°30′30″E
- Country: Iran
- Province: Qom
- County: Jafarabad
- District: Central
- Rural District: Baqerabad

Population (2016)
  - Total: 1,739
- Time zone: UTC+3:30 (IRST)

Baqerabad (Persian: باقراباد) (Note: Also romanized as Bāqerābād; also known as Bāqirābād) is a village in, and the capital of, Baqerabad Rural District in the Central District (Note: Formerly Jafarabad District of Qom County) of Jafarabad County, Qom province, Iran.

== Demographics ==
=== Population ===
At the time of the 2006 National Census, the village's population was 1,282 in 279 households, when it was in Jafarabad Rural District of Jafarabad District (Note: Renamed the Central District of Jafarabad County) in Qom County. The following census in 2011 counted 1,951 people in 501 households. The 2016 census measured the population of the village as 1,739 people in 459 households, the most populous in its rural district.

In 2021, the district was separated from the county in the establishment of Jafarabad County and renamed the Central District. Baqerabad was transferred to Baqerabad Rural District created in the same district.
