= Rose Garden =

A rose garden is a garden or park used for growing roses.

Rose Garden or The Rose Garden may also refer to:

== Places ==
- White House Rose Garden, Washington, DC
- Rose Garden, San Jose, California, a neighborhood
- Rose Garden Palace, also known as Rose Garden, an historic property in Dhaka, Bangladesh
- Rose Garden, Coburg, Bavaria, Germany, a park
- Royal Thai Air Base Nam Phong, Thailand, nicknamed Rose Garden

== Arts and entertainment ==
=== Music ===
- The Rose Garden (band), American folk rock group
  - The Rose Garden (album), a 1968 album by The Rose Garden
- Rose Garden (album), a 1971 album by Lynn Anderson
- "Rose Garden" (Joe South song), a 1968 song written and first recorded by Joe South
- "Rose Garden" (Nick Jonas & the Administration song), 2010
- "Rose Garden", a song by Rae Morris on the 2018 album Someone Out There

=== Other arts and entertainment ===
- Gulistan of Sa'di, or The Rose Garden, a 1259 book by Saadi of Shiraz
- The Rose Garden (film), a 1989 film directed by Fons Rademakers
- "The Rose Garden" (short story), a ghost story by M. R. James
- "The Rose Garden" (Suspense), a 1951 episode of the TV series Suspense

== Other uses ==
- Moda Center (formerly Rose Garden), an indoor sports arena in Portland, Oregon, US
- Port and Airport Development Strategy or Rose Garden Project, a Hong Kong infrastructure project

== See also ==
- Rosegarden, digital audio workstation software
- Gulistan (disambiguation), "rose garden" in Persian
