= Elisa Fuksas =

Italian film director and writer

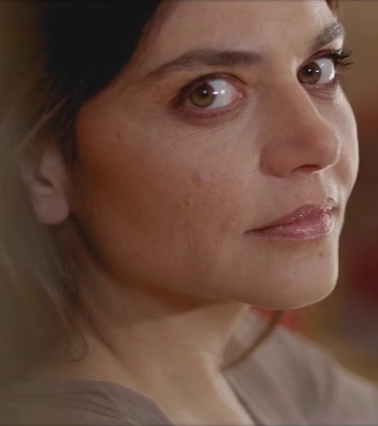
- Born: 1981 (age 43–44); Rome, Italy
- Occupation(s): Film director, writer

Elisa Fuksas (born 1981) is an Italian film director and writer.

== Career ==
Born in Rome in 1981, she is the daughter of Italian architect Massimiliano Fuksas and his second wife Doriana Mandrelli. Her early short film Please Leave a Message was awarded with the Nastro d'Argento in 2007. Fuksas debuted with a feature film in 2012 with Nina, starring Luca Marinelli and Diane Fleri. In 2019, she directed the Netflix original film The App. In 2021, her documentary Senza fine, about the life and career of Italian singer Ornella Vanoni, premiered at the 78th Venice International Film Festival in the "Giornate degli Autori" panel.

== Filmography ==
- Please Leave a Message – short film (2007)
- L'Italia del nostro scontento – documentary (2009)
- Nina (2012)
- Chinese Honeymoon – documentary (2015)
- Albe: A Life Beyond Earth – documentary (2018)
- The App (2019)
- iSola – documentary (2020)
- Senza fine – documentary (2021)

== Works ==
- La figlia di (Rizzoli, 2014)
- Michele, Anna e la termodinamica (Elliot, 2017)
- Ama e fai quello che vuoi (Marsilio, 2020)
- Non fiori ma opere di bene (Marsilio, 2022)
