= Baqerabad Rural District (Jafarabad County) =

Rural district in Qom province, Iran

Baqerabad Rural District Persian: دهستان باقرآباد
- Rural District
- Location within Iran
- Coordinates: 34°44′N 50°31′E
- Country: Iran
- Province: Qom
- County: Jafarabad
- District: Central
- Established: 2021
- Capital: Baqerabad
- Time zone: UTC+3:30 (IRST)

Baqerabad Rural District (Persian: دهستان باقرآباد) is in the Central District (Note: Formerly Jafarabad District of Qom County) of Jafarabad County, Qom province, Iran. Its capital is the village of Baqerabad, whose population at the time of the National Census of 2016 was 1,739 in 459 households.

== History ==
In 2021, Jafarabad District (Note: Renamed the Central District of Jafarabad County) and Qahan Rural District were separated from Qom County in the establishment of Jafarabad County, and Baqerabad Rural District was created in the Central District.

== Other villages in the rural district ==
- Aliabad-e Enqelab
- Asgarli
- Dizar
- Dowlatabad
- Golestan
- Kalagh Neshin
- Sharifabad-e Zand
- Taghrud
