= Sharifabad-e Zand =

Village in Qom province, Iran

Sharifabad-e Zand Persian: شريف ابادزند
- Village
- Location within Iran
- Coordinates: 34°49′03″N 50°36′12″E
- Country: Iran
- Province: Qom
- County: Jafarabad
- District: Central
- Rural District: Baqerabad

Population (2016)
  - Total: 327
- Time zone: UTC+3:30 (IRST)

Sharifabad-e Zand (Persian: شريف ابادزند) (Note: Also romanized as Sharīfābād-e Zand; also known as Sharīfābād and Sharīfābād-e Zarand) is a village in Baqerabad Rural District of the Central District (Note: Formerly Jafarabad District of Qom County) in Jafarabad County, Qom province, Iran.

== Demographics ==
=== Population ===
At the time of the 2006 National Census, the village's population was 329 in 85 households, when it was in Jafarabad Rural District of Jafarabad District (Note: Renamed the Central District of Jafarabad County) in Qom County. The following census in 2011 counted 354 people in 108 households. The 2016 census measured the population of the village as 327 people in 105 households.

In 2021, the district was separated from the county in the establishment of Jafarabad County and renamed the Central District. Sharifabad-e Zand was transferred to Baqerabad Rural District created in the same district.
