= Asgarli =

Village in Qom province, Iran

Asgarli Persian: عسگرلي
- Village
- Location within Iran
- Coordinates: 34°47′57″N 50°30′54″E
- Country: Iran
- Province: Qom
- County: Jafarabad
- District: Central
- Rural District: Baqerabad

Population (2016)
  - Total: 309
- Time zone: UTC+3:30 (IRST)

Asgarli (Persian: عسگرلي) (Note: Also romanized as ‘Asgarlī; also known as ‘Asgarlū and ‘Askarlī) is a village in Baqerabad Rural District of the Central District (Note: Formerly Jafarabad District of Qom County) in Jafarabad County, Qom province, Iran.

== Demographics ==
=== Population ===
At the time of the 2006 National Census, the village's population was 441 in 104 households, when it was in Jafarabad Rural District of Jafarabad District (Note: Renamed the Central District of Jafarabad County) in Qom County. The following census in 2011 counted 422 people in 100 households. The 2016 census measured the population of the village as 309 people in 79 households.

In 2021, the district was separated from the county in the establishment of Jafarabad County and renamed the Central District. Asgarli was transferred to Baqerabad Rural District created in the same district.
