= Siblings (film) =

2025 comedy drama film

- Directed by: Greta Scarano
- Screenplay by: Sofia Assirelli; Tieta Madia; Greta Scarano
- Produced by: Matteo Rovere
- Starring: Matilda De Angelis; Yuri Tuci
- Cinematography: Valerio Azzali
- Edited by: Valeria Sapienza
- Music by: Giuseppe Tranquillino Minerva
- Distributed by: 01 Distribution
- Release date: 3 April 2025
- Running time: 96 minutes
- Country: Italy
- Language: Italian

Siblings (Italian: La vita da grandi, lit. 'Grown-up life') is a 2025 Italian comedy-drama film co-written and directed by Greta Scarano, in her feature directorial debut.

== Plot ==
Irene works in Rome for a company that produces solar panels, a stable job that nevertheless leaves her feeling creatively stifled. Her routine is shaken when her mother, who needs to leave home with her husband to undergo further medical tests concerning her own health, calls her to Rimini to look after her brother Omar—an autistic man, a huge rap and Fabri Fibra fan, who has been overprotected by his family and, as a result, has never managed to become independent.

In order to encourage her brother’s independence—and to avoid the risk of having to take care of him herself when their parents become too old to do so—Irene puts him through an “intensive course in becoming an adult.” Over time, however, she realizes that she has more in common with Omar than she ever imagined, including the dreams they both hold onto and that, unlike her, her brother has the courage to pursue.

After a shocking revelation from Omar, Irene decides to change her attitude toward him and try to grow up alongside him, even if it means taking a few risks.

== Cast ==
- Matilda De Angelis as Irene Nanni
- Yuri Tuci as Omar Nanni
- Maria Amelia Monti as Piera
- Paolo Hendel as Walter
- Adriano Pantaleo as Ugo
- Christian Ginepro as Ludovico
- Ariella Reggio as Aunt Marilù
- Gloria Coco as Grandma Cleta
- Alessandro Cantalini as Marco
- Ludovico Zucconi as Tancredi
- Tom Karumathy as Artrit
- Sara Setti as Sara Ravaglioli
- Mara Maionchi as herself
- Ferzan Ozpetek as himself
- Malika Ayane as herself
- Valerio Lundini as himself

== Production ==
The film is based on the 2020 autobiographical novel Mia sorella mi rompe le balle ('My sister is busting my balls') by Margherita and Damiano Tercon. It was mainly shot in Rimini, with scenes also filmed in Bologna and Rome. It was produced by Groenlandia, Halong and Rai Cinema, in collaboration with Netflix.

== Release ==
The film premiered at the 2025 Bari International Film Festival in Bari, where it received the SIAE Debut Film prize. It was screened in the 59th Karlovy Vary International Film Festival. It was released in Italian cinemas by 01 Distribution on 3 April 2025, one day after the World Autism Awareness Day.

== Reception ==
The film won two Nastro d'Argento awards, for best new director and best actor in a comedy film (Yuri Tuci). It won the European Film Academy Young Audience Award at the 38th European Film Awards.
