= Kalagh Neshin, Qom =

Village in Qom province, Iran

Kalagh Neshin Persian: كلاغ نشين
- Village
- Location within Iran
- Coordinates: 34°41′40″N 50°25′37″E
- Country: Iran
- Province: Qom
- County: Jafarabad
- District: Central
- Rural District: Baqerabad

Population (2016)
  - Total: 78
- Time zone: UTC+3:30 (IRST)

Kalagh Neshin (Persian: كلاغ نشين) (Note: Also romanized as Kalāgh Neshīn) is a village in Baqerabad Rural District of the Central District (Note: Formerly Jafarabad District of Qom County) in Jafarabad County, Qom province, Iran.

== Demographics ==
=== Population ===
At the time of the 2006 National Census, the village's population was 60 in 20 households, when it was in Jafarabad Rural District of Jafarabad District (Note: Renamed the Central District of Jafarabad County) in Qom County. The following census in 2011 counted 66 people in 20 households. The 2016 census measured the population of the village as 78 people in 25 households.

In 2021, the district was separated from the county in the establishment of Jafarabad County and renamed the Central District. Kalagh Neshin was transferred to Baqerabad Rural District created in the same district.
