= The Line (2022 film) =

2022 drama film

- Theatrical release poster
- French: La Ligne
- Directed by: Ursula Meier
- Screenplay by: Ursula Meier; Stéphanie Blanchoud; Antoine Jacoud; Robin Campillo (collaboration); Nathalie Najem (collaboration)
- Produced by: Pauline Gygax; Max Karli
- Starring: Stéphanie Blanchoud; Valeria Bruni Tedeschi
- Cinematography: Agnès Godard
- Edited by: Nelly Quettier
- Music by: Jean-François Assy; Stéphanie Blanchoud; Benjamin Biolay
- Production companies: Bandita Films; Les Films de Pierre; Les Films du Fleuve; Arte France Cinéma; Radio Télévision Suisse; RTBF; VOO; BE TV
- Distributed by: Diaphana Distribution
- Release dates: 11 February 2022 (Berlin); 11 January 2023 (France)
- Running time: 101 minutes
- Countries: Switzerland; France; Belgium
- Language: French

The Line (French: La Ligne) is a 2022 drama film directed by Ursula Meier. It is a Swiss, French and Belgian co-production. The film explores a turbulent mother–daughter relationship and stars Stéphanie Blanchoud and Valeria Bruni Tedeschi. It had its world premiere on 11 February 2022 at the 72nd Berlin International Film Festival, where it competed for the Golden Bear.

== Premise ==
After a violent argument with her mother, Margaret is subject to a restraining order before her trial: she is no longer allowed to make contact with her mother or approach within 100 metres of the family home for three months. Her younger stepsister Marion paints a physical line into the grass around the family home to mark this boundary. Every day, Margaret appears at this 100-metre threshold to see Marion and give her music lessons.

== Release ==
The film was selected to compete for the Golden Bear in the main competition section of the 72nd Berlin International Film Festival, where the film had its world premiere on 11 February 2022. The film was released in France by Diaphana Distribution on 11 January 2023.

== Cast ==
- Stéphanie Blanchoud as Margaret
- Valeria Bruni Tedeschi as Christina
- Elli Spagnolo as Marion
- India Hair as Louise
- Dali Benssalah as Hervé
- Benjamin Biolay as Julien
- Éric Ruf as Serge
- Thomas Wiesel as Claudio
- Jean-François Stévenin as Fisher
- Louis Gence as Youri

== Reception ==
=== Critical response ===
The Line received an average rating of 3.4 out of 5 stars on the French website AlloCiné, based on 22 reviews. On Rotten Tomatoes, the film holds an approval rating of 60% based on 15 reviews, with an average rating of 5.6/10. According to Metacritic, which assigned a weighted average score of 60 out of 100 based on 6 critics, the film received "generally favorable" reviews.

Peter Bradshaw of The Guardian gave the film four out of five stars, praising the lead performances of Blanchoud and Bruni-Tedeschi. Anna Smith of Deadline Hollywood called it an "arresting story of familial disharmony that's distinctive both visually and thematically." The Hollywood Reporter's Jordan Mintzer praised the cast performance and direction, but lamented that the film "explores the tense and thorny nature of blood ties without ever delving into the psychology of it all, often leaving us in the dark as to why the characters behave the way they do." Variety's Peter Debruge deemed Blanchoud's performance to be the foundation of the film's impactfulness and praised the film's "downright radical" narrative for "[rejecting] aggression as an acceptable means of resolving problems".

=== Accolades ===
Award	Date of ceremony	Category	Recipient(s)	Result	Ref.
Berlin International Film Festival	20 February 2022	Golden Bear	Ursula Meier	Nominated	
Magritte Awards	9 March 2024	Best Original Score	Stéphanie Blanchoud, Benjamin Biolay and Jean-François Assy	Nominated	
