= Zavareh =

City in Isfahan province, Iran

Zavareh Persian: زواره
- City
- Location within Iran
- Coordinates: 33°26′41″N 52°29′08″E
- Country: Iran
- Province: Isfahan
- County: Ardestan
- District: Zavareh

Population (2016)
  - Total: 8,320
- Time zone: UTC+3:30 (IRST)

Zavareh (Persian: زواره) (Note: Also romanized as Zavāreh and Zavvāreh; also known as Īstgāh-ye Zavār, Zavâre, and Zūrāvar) is a city in, and the capital of, Zavareh District in Ardestan County, Isfahan province, Iran.

== Demographics ==
=== Population ===
At the time of the 2006 National Census, the city's population was 7,806 in 2,197 households. The following census in 2011 counted 7,814 people in 2,385 households. The 2016 census measured the population of the city as 8,320 people in 2,671 households.

== Overview ==
Zavareh is in the northeast of the province, next to the central desert area. It is known that Zavareh had a Sassanian fire temple and was an important trade center in the Seljuk period. The town is named after Zavara, the brother of Rostam, a mythical hero of Iran.

== Historical sites ==
- Zavareh Grand Mosque: An inscription in the entrance stucco dates this Seljuk-era mosque to 1135–1136, making it the first known dated mosque constructed according to a four-portico (iwan) plan in the post-Islamic Iran.
- Pa Minar Mosque: The minaret of this mosque bears a Kufic inscription in brick, dating it to 1068–1069. This makes it the second oldest dated minaret in Iran, the oldest being at Saveh. The minaret makes part of a Seljuk mosque, which has been restored during the Il-Khanid period.
- Zavareh's Kariz Qanat: This qanat dates back to 5000 year ago, a network of underground canals that delivers water from distant resources.
