= Sister (2012 film) =

2012 film

- French film poster
- Directed by: Ursula Meier
- Written by: Antoine Jaccoud; Ursula Meier
- Produced by: Denis Freyd
- Starring: Léa Seydoux; Kacey Mottet Klein
- Cinematography: Agnès Godard
- Edited by: Nelly Quettier
- Music by: John Parish
- Distributed by: Filmcoopi Zürich AG (Switzerland); Diaphana Films (France)
- Release dates: 13 February 2012 (Berlin); 4 April 2012 (Switzerland); 18 April 2012 (France)
- Running time: 93 minutes
- Countries: Switzerland; France
- Language: French
- Budget: €4.6 million
- Box office: $1.2 million

Sister (French: L'Enfant d'en haut, lit. 'The Child Above') is a 2012 drama film directed by Ursula Meier. The film competed in competition at the 62nd Berlin International Film Festival, where it won the Special Award, the Silver Bear. The film was selected as the Swiss entry for the Best Foreign Language Oscar at the 85th Academy Awards, making the January shortlist.

== Plot ==
Twelve-year-old Simon (Kacey Mottet Klein) lives with his older sister, Louise (Léa Seydoux), in a housing complex below a luxury Swiss ski resort. Despite his age, he supports them by stealing equipment from skiers, then refurbishing and reselling it. Most of the money goes to support Louise's lifestyle. She is selfish and irresponsible, unable to hold down a job and frequently going off with men, leaving Simon alone. Though he tries to teach her how to refurbish skis, she shows little interest or aptitude and leaves with Bruno (Yann Trégouët) on a vacation.

Simon meets tourist Kristin (Gillian Anderson) by helping her with her son's equipment. He introduces himself as Julien, her son's name, explaining he is alone because his parents are running a hotel. They have lunch and he is surprised when she pays the bill, as he is used to supporting Louise. He also meets Mike (Martin Compston), a resort employee who catches him hoarding stolen skis. After Simon explains that he sells them for food and necessities, they partner. Simon continues to steal, and in return for some equipment, Mike provides a storage place. Simon says that his parents died in a car accident and he is alone.

Louise returns from her trip with Bruno, who stays the night. Louise says that Simon is staying temporarily. When Bruno asks Simon where he lives, Simon replies "with my parents" and that they have a "fucked-up family." Bruno takes them driving to give Louise practice to help her with job hunting. After Simon sees them flirting, he reveals that Louise is his mother, not his sister. Despite Louise saying that she would have confessed eventually, Bruno forces them out of the car and they walk home. Louise demands that Simon follow her at a distance; she keeps their relationship secret because being a single parent makes it hard to get a boyfriend or a job. She says he has been her "ball and chain", while he responds that he supports her.

That night, Simon pays Louise in order to sleep in her bed. Louise admits that she only kept him so she would not be lonely and to defy all those who said she should not keep him. After Simon falls asleep, Louise sneaks out and gets drunk. She is found passed out the next morning, and Simon carries her home with the help of other children. He realizes that she had spent all their money.

In order to replace what Louise spent, Simon returns to the resort with a much younger child. Mike rebukes Simon for this and ends their partnership. Simon hides the skis anyway and steals children's purses from their changing room but only finds small change. His hidden equipment is found and he is thrown out. He fails to sell the rest of his equipment on the roadside.

Without income, Simon asks an old customer for food, which Louise cooks. She takes him to her new chalet cleaning job, claiming he is helping her. She gives him some money, telling him that she does not want to be in his debt. They end up at Kristin's cabin, who is disappointed when she realizes that Simon lied about who he is. He apologizes but she rebuffs him. Later, she confronts Louise and Simon because a watch is missing. Louise does not believe Simon when he turns out his pockets and finds the watch in his pants, and Kristin coldly dismisses them.

Louise is infuriated that Simon cost her a job and they fight. Simon goes to the resort and finds the staff are leaving as it is the end of the season and they are moving on to other jobs. He asks if he can come, but is turned down because of his obvious youth. He takes a cable car back down and passes Louise, who is going up. She presses herself against the glass and calls to him as the two cars separate.

== Cast ==
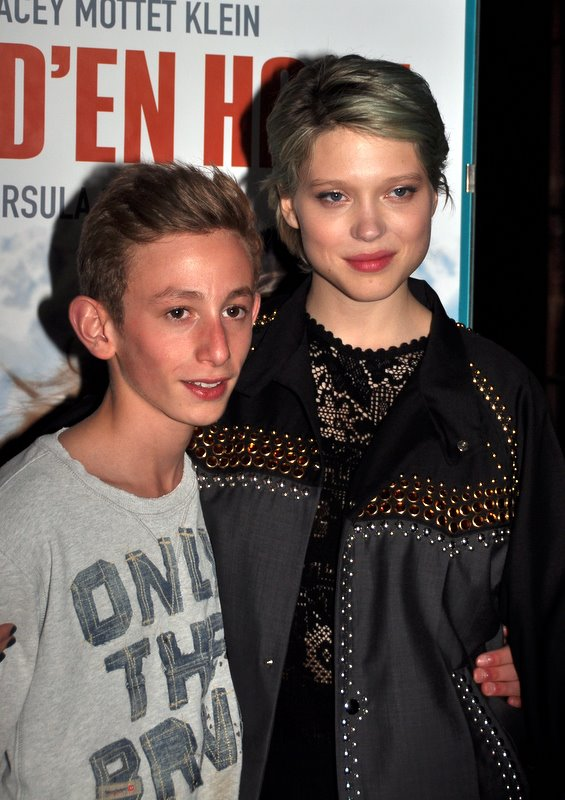
Stars Kacey Mottet Klein and Léa Seydoux at a screening in April 2012.

- Léa Seydoux as Louise
- Kacey Mottet Klein as Simon
- Gillian Anderson as Kristin Jansen
- Martin Compston as Mike
- Jean-François Stévenin as Cook
- Yann Trégouët as Bruno
- Gabin Lefebvre as Marcus
- Dilon Ademi as Dilon

== Reception ==
=== Critical response ===
Review aggregation website Rotten Tomatoes reported an approval rating of 97%, based on 71 reviews, with an average score of 7.8/10. The website's critical consensus states: "Léa Seydoux and Kacey Mottet Klein are exceptional as downtrodden siblings in this sad and wintry character study". At Metacritic, which assigns a normalized rating using reviews from mainstream critics, the film received an average score of 81 out of 100, based on 19 reviews, indicating "universal acclaim".

Jaques Mandelbaum of The Guardian wrote "Meier explores the cruel physical and atmospheric contrasts between the two worlds, high and low, dwelling on the cloudy skies, grimy slush and the shadow cast by the peaks, which brings semi-darkness to the valley bottom." The film was awarded The Krzysztof Kieslowski Award for Best Foreign Feature Film at the 35th Starz Denver Film Festival. The award's jury made this statement about the film: "A well crafted narrative that explores the highs and lows of a complicated familial relationship with authentic performances, supported by grand cinematography, pulls you into the unfamiliar world of a childhood thief whose only constant is the love shared between him and his sister."

=== Accolades ===
Award / Film Festival	Category	Recipients and nominees	Result
Berlin International Film Festival	Special Award – Silver Bear		Won
Berlin International Film Festival	Golden Bear		Nominated
Cabourg Film Festival	Swann d'Or for Best Actress	Léa Seydoux	Won
César Awards	Most Promising Actor	Kacey Mottet Klein	Nominated
Denver Film Festival	Krzysztof Kieslowski Award for Best Feature		Won
European Film Awards	Young Audience Award		Nominated
Hawaii International Film Festival	EuroCinema Hawai`i Award for Best Actor	Kacey Mottet Klein	Won
Independent Spirit Awards	Best International Film		Nominated
Lumière Awards	Best French-Language Film		Nominated
Swiss Film Award	Best Film		Won
Swiss Film Award	Best Actor	Kacey Mottet Klein	Won
Swiss Film Award	Best Screenplay	Ursula Meier and Antoine Jaccoud	Won

== See also ==
- List of submissions to the 85th Academy Awards for Best Foreign Language Film
- List of Swiss submissions for the Academy Award for Best Foreign Language Film
