= The App =

- Directed by: Elisa Fuksas
- Written by: Elisa Fuksas; Lucio Pellegrini
- Starring: Vincenzo Crea; Jessica Cressy; Greta Scarano
- Production companies: Indiana Production Company; Netflix
- Distributed by: Netflix
- Release date: December 26, 2019
- Running time: 79 minutes
- Country: Italy
- Language: Italian

The App is a 2019 Italian drama directed by Elisa Fuksas, written by Elisa Fuksas and Lucio Pellegrini, and starring Vincenzo Crea, Jessica Cressy and Greta Scarano.

It was released on 26 December 2019 on Netflix.

== Synopsis ==
Loving girlfriend, family fortune, breakout movie role: he's got it all. Until an app awakens a powerful new yearning. While in Rome to shoot his first movie, actor and industrial heir Niccolò becomes obsessed with the dating app “US” that sends him into a self-destructive spiral.

== Cast ==
- Vincenzo Crea as Niccolò
- Jessica Cressy as Eva
- Greta Scarano as Ofelia
- Maya Sansa as Maria
- Abel Ferrara as the film director
- Anita Kravos as Matilde
- Giampiero Judica as attorney Tommaso Trapani
- Romeo Pellegrini as John
- Stella Mastrantonio as Miriam
- Beatrice Puccilli as Molly

== Release ==
The App was released by Netflix on December 26, 2019.
