= Without Pity (2014 film) =

- Directed by: Michele Alhaique
- Written by: Michele Alhaique; Andrea Garello; Emanuele Scaringi
- Starring: Pierfrancesco Favino; Greta Scarano; Claudio Gioè
- Cinematography: Ivan Casalgrandi
- Music by: Yuksek; Luca Novelli
- Release date: 11 September 2014
- Running time: 95 minutes

Without Pity (Italian: Senza nessuna pietà) is a 2014 Italian crime-thriller film co-written and directed by Michele Alhaique. It was screened in the Horizons section at the 71st Venice International Film Festival.

== Plot ==
Rome. Mimmo is the adopted son of the crime family led by Santili, the patriarch. Mimmo and his cousin Manuel, the legitimate son of the boss, act in a ruthless and arrogant way for the whole city, now terrified by their power. Despite everything, however, Mimmo, even if loyal to his family, would like to get out and live a quiet and peaceful life. He receives the task of bringing an escort, Tania, to his cousin's house in view of a party but, in love with her, he manages to take her away after hitting Manuel with a skateboard.

== Cast ==
- Pierfrancesco Favino as Mimmo
- Greta Scarano as Tania
- Claudio Gioè as Roscio
- Adriano Giannini as Manuel
- Iris Peynado as Pilar
- Ninetto Davoli as Santili
- Renato Marchetti as Stefanino
- Samantha Fantauzzi as Deborah

== See also ==
- List of Italian films of 2014
