= Gulstan =

Gulstan or Gülstan may refer to:

- Gülstan, Jalal-Abad, a village in Suzak District, Jalal-Abad Region, Kyrgyzstan
- Gülstan, Osh, a village in Nookat District, Osh Region, Kyrgyzstan
- Gulstan Ropert, (1839-1903), French Roman Catholic prelate, missionary in the Hawaiian Islands

== See also ==
- Gulistan (disambiguation)
