= Taghrud =

Village in Qom province, Iran

Taghrud Persian: طغرود
- Village
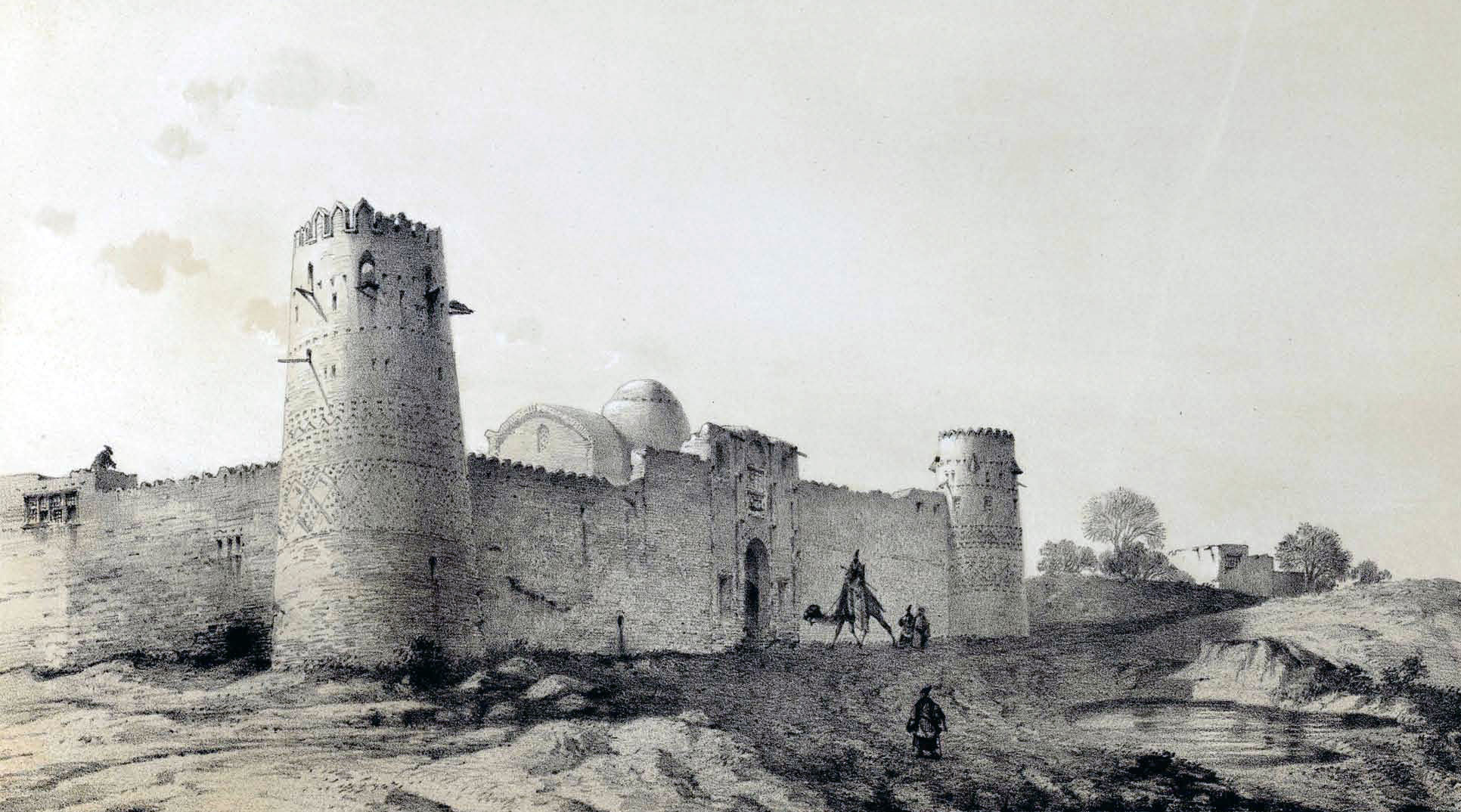
- Drawing by Eugène Flandin of the village of Taghrud

- Location within Iran
- Coordinates: 34°44′14″N 50°30′43″E
- Country: Iran
- Province: Qom
- County: Jafarabad
- District: Central
- Rural District: Baqerabad

Population (2016)
  - Total: 457
- Time zone: UTC+3:30 (IRST)

Taghrud (Persian: طغرود) (Note: Also romanized as Tagharūd, Ţaghrūd, Tah Rūd, Tājrūd, Ţaqrūd, Tegārūd, Toghrood, and Ţoghrūd) is a village in Baqerabad Rural District of the Central District (Note: Formerly Jafarabad District of Qom County) in Jafarabad County, Qom province, Iran.

== Demographics ==
=== Population ===
At the time of the 2006 National Census, the village's population was 438 in 125 households, when it was in Jafarabad Rural District of Jafarabad District (Note: Renamed the Central District of Jafarabad County) in Qom County. The following census in 2011 counted 480 people in 146 households. The 2016 census measured the population of the village as 457 people in 143 households.

In 2021, the district was separated from the county in the establishment of Jafarabad County and renamed the Central District. Taghrud was transferred to Baqerabad Rural District created in the same district.
