= Golestan, Firuzeh =

Golestan گلستان
- Village
- Location within Iran
- Coordinates: 36°14′43″N 58°36′55″E
- Country: Iran
- Province: Razavi Khorasan
- County: Firuzeh
- Bakhsh: Central
- Rural District: Takht-e Jolgeh

Population (2006)
  - Total: 156
- Time zone: UTC+3:30 (IRST)
  - Summer (DST): UTC+4:30 (IRDT)

Golestan (Persian: گلستان, also Romanized as Golestān) is a village in Takht-e Jolgeh Rural District, in the Central District of Firuzeh County, Razavi Khorasan Province, Iran. At the 2006 census, its population was 156, in 35 families.
