= Gulshan Rai Khatri =

Indian medical doctor (1944–2020)

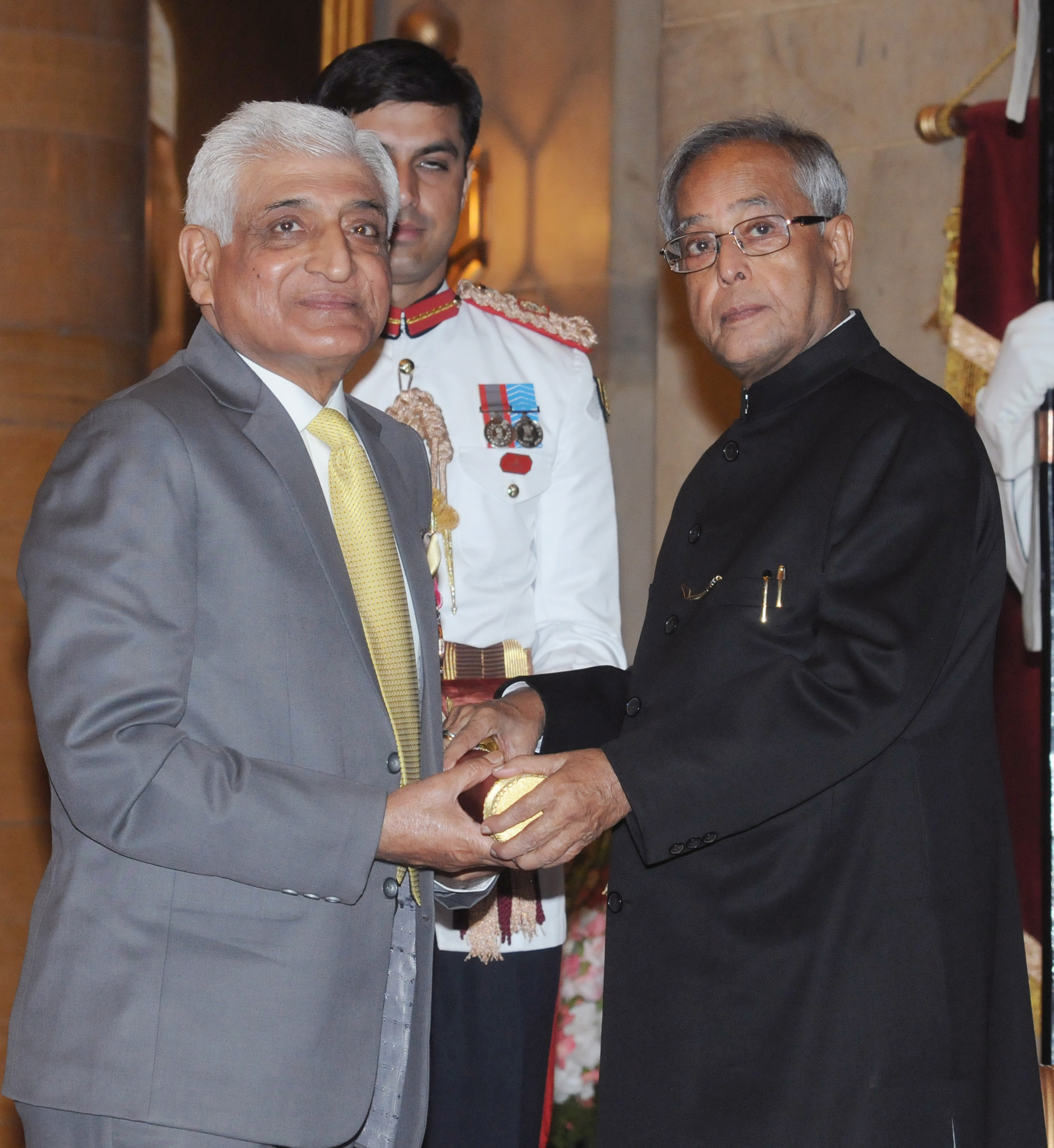
- The President, Shri Pranab Mukherjee presenting the Padma Shri Award to Dr. Gulshan Rai Khatri, at an Investiture Ceremony-II, at Rashtrapati Bhavan, in New Delhi on April 20, 2013.
- Born: July 10, 1944; Dera Ismail Khan, North-West Frontier Province, India (now in Khyber Pakhtunkhwa, Pakistan)
- Died: July 16, 2020; Shanti Mukand Hospital, Delhi
- Occupation(s): Physician, public health expert
- Spouse: Anita Khatri (née- Tandon)
- Children: Rajat Rai Khatri, Shilpa Khatri Babbar
- Parent(s): Jamandas Khatri, Krishna Kumari Khatri
- Awards: Padma Shri

Gulshan Rai Khatri was an Indian medical doctor and public health specialist, known for his efforts in curbing the disease of tuberculosis worldwide. He was honoured by the Government of India, in 2013, by bestowing on him the Padma Shri, the fourth highest civilian award, for his contributions to the fields of medicine and medical education. In 2018, he was diagnosed with multiple myeloma, a form of blood cancer and after a long array of health problems, he succumbed to a heart and lung seizure on July 16, 2020.

== Biography ==
The only way to control MDR tuberculosis is to stop producing it, But that seems to have taken a back seat. Districts not running good DOTS programmes, need to be first strengthened for DOTS before rolling out PMDT (Programmatic Management of MDR tuberculosis), says Dr. Gulshan Rai Khatri.

Gulshan Rai Khatri hailed from Dera Ismail Khan but shifted to Delhi along with his family after the partition of India. He graduated in medicine from the Maulana Azad Medical College in the city in 1966. He also secured post graduate degrees of DPH and MD with specialization in community medicine.

Khatri joined the Government of India in 1966, after his graduation, and, over the years, rose in rank to head the nationwide tuberculosis programme. During his tenure, he managed what is rated by many as the largest Directly Observed Short Course (DOTS) TB and chronic obstructive pulmonary disease (COPD) treatment in history which started with 18 million patients in 1998 and covered 500 million patients at the time of his retirement from service in 2002. During this period, it is reported that the death rate due to the disease was brought down to 5 per cent.

After his retirement, Khatri joined World Lung Foundation as a technical advisor on lung health and also worked as a member of the World Health Organization Expert Advisory Panel on Tuberculosis. He also participated in workshops and seminars to deliver keynote addresses as a global consultant.

Gulshan Rai Khatri was honoured by the Government of India with the civilian award of Padma Shri, in 2013.

== See also ==
- Maulana Azad Medical College
