= Golestan-e Emamzadeh Jafar =

Golestan-e Emamzadeh Jafar گلستان امام زاده جعفر
- Village
- Location within Iran
- Coordinates: 30°19′50″N 50°57′58″E
- Country: Iran
- Province: Kohgiluyeh and Boyer-Ahmad
- County: Gachsaran
- Bakhsh: Central
- Rural District: Emamzadeh Jafar

Population (2006)
  - Total: 26
- Time zone: UTC+3:30 (IRST)
  - Summer (DST): UTC+4:30 (IRDT)

Golestan-e Emamzadeh Jafar (Persian: گلستان امام زاده جعفر, also Romanized as Golestān-e Emāmzādeh Jaʿfar; also known as Golestān) is a village in Emamzadeh Jafar Rural District, in the Central District of Gachsaran County, Kohgiluyeh and Boyer-Ahmad Province, Iran. At the 2006 census, its population was 26, in 6 families.
