= Guliston (magazine) =

Uzbek magazine

- Frequency: monthly
- Publisher: Ministry of Cultural Affairs of Uzbekistan
- Founded: 1925 (as Yer Yuzi)
- Country: Uzbekistan
- Based in: Tashkent
- Language: Uzbek

Guliston (Uzbek: Guliston, Гулистон) is an Uzbek-language magazine that covers a wide variety of topics, from art and culture to politics and history. It has been described as the "Uzbek Ogonyok" due to the similarity in contents, themes, and popularity. As of 2019 the head editor is Mamatqul Hazratqulov.

== History ==
Guliston was founded in 1925 as Yer Yuzi and 202 issues of it were published before it was renamed to Oʻzbekiston qurilishda in 1932. It was then renamed to Mashʼala in 1934 before settling on the name Guliston in 1935.

Publication of the magazine was temporarily suspended in 1941 but did not resume until 1967. In the Soviet era, the magazine focused on Communist themes and promoted literature by acclaimed Soviet writers, especially Uzbek writers such as Abdulla Qodiriy, Choʻlpon, Abdurauf Fitrat, Gʻafur Gʻulom, Oybek, Abdulla Alaviy but also writers of other nationalities such as Rasul Gamzatov.
