= Kelestan =

Kelestan كلستان
- Village
- Location within Iran
- Coordinates: 29°53′05″N 52°18′21″E
- Country: Iran
- Province: Fars
- County: Shiraz
- Bakhsh: Central
- Rural District: Derak

Population (2006)
  - Total: 1,945
- Time zone: UTC+3:30 (IRST)
  - Summer (DST): UTC+4:30 (IRDT)

Kelestan (Persian: كلستان, also Romanized as Kelestān; also known as Golestān, Gulistan, Kalistan, and Ketestān) is a village in Derak Rural District, in the Central District of Shiraz County, Fars province, Iran. At the 2006 census, its population was 1,945, in 492 families.
