= Sofla Rural District (Ardestan County) =

Rural district in Isfahan province, Iran

Sofla Rural District Persian: دهستان سفلی
- Rural District
- Location within Iran
- Coordinates: 33°40′N 52°48′E
- Country: Iran
- Province: Isfahan
- County: Ardestan
- District: Zavareh
- Established: 1993
- Capital: Shahrab

Population (2016)
  - Total: 405
- Time zone: UTC+3:30 (IRST)

Sofla Rural District (Persian: دهستان سفلی) is in Zavareh District of Ardestan County, Isfahan province, Iran. Its capital is the village of Shahrab.

== Demographics ==
=== Population ===
At the time of the 2006 National Census, the rural district's population was 784 in 330 households. There were 540 inhabitants in 224 households at the following census of 2011. The 2016 census measured the population of the rural district as 405 in 250 households. The most populous of its 22 villages was Sepideh, with 74 people.

=== Other villages in the rural district ===
- Bab ol Bagh
- Kahyaz
- Mozdabad-e Bala
- Sahruyeh
- Sianak-e Pain
- Tallabad
