= Golshan-e Bozorg Mokhtar =

Golshan-e Bozorg Mokhtar گلشن بزرگ مختار
- Village
- Location within Iran
- Coordinates: 30°40′26″N 51°30′44″E
- Country: Iran
- Province: Kohgiluyeh and Boyer-Ahmad
- County: Boyer-Ahmad
- Bakhsh: Central
- Rural District: Sarrud-e Jonubi

Population (2006)
  - Total: 55
- Time zone: UTC+3:30 (IRST)
  - Summer (DST): UTC+4:30 (IRDT)

Golshan-e Bozorg Mokhtar (Persian: گلشن بزرگ مختار, also Romanized as Golshan-e Bozorg Mokhtār; also known as Golshan) is a village in Sarrud-e Jonubi Rural District, in the Central District of Boyer-Ahmad County, Kohgiluyeh and Boyer-Ahmad Province, Iran. At the 2006 census, its population was 55, in 14 families.
