= Dar Bagh, Bam =

Dar Bagh درباغ
- Village
- Location within Iran
- Coordinates: 29°07′30″N 58°16′20″E
- Country: Iran
- Province: Kerman
- County: Bam
- Bakhsh: Central
- Rural District: Howmeh

Population (2006)
  - Total: 115
- Time zone: UTC+3:30 (IRST)
  - Summer (DST): UTC+4:30 (IRDT)

Dar Bagh (Persian: درباغ, also Romanized as Dar Bāgh and Dar-e Bāgh; also known as Darb-e Bāgh) is a village in Howmeh Rural District, in the Central District of Bam County, Kerman Province, Iran. At the 2006 census, its population was 115, in 42 families.
