= Gulistan, Punjab =

Town in Pakistan

Gulistan گلستان
- Location within Pakistan
- Coordinates: 30.29°N 72.43°E
- Country: Pakistan
- Province: Punjab
- District: Sahiwal
- Elevation: 159 m (522 ft)
- Time zone: UTC+5 (PST)

Gulistan (Urdu, Punjabi: گلستان) is a town of Sahiwal District in the Punjab province of Pakistan. It is located at 30°29'0N 72°43'0E with an altitude of 159 metres (524 feet). Neighbouring settlements include Agra and Chandol.
