= Gulistan, Baramulla =

Gulistan
- Village
- Location in Jammu and Kashmir, India Gulistan (India)
- Coordinates: 34.11°N 74.32°E
- Country: India
- Union Territory: Jammu and Kashmir
- District: Baramulla

Population (2011)
  - Total: 1,634

Languages
  - Official: Kashmiri, Urdu, Hindi, Dogri, English
  - Spoken: Gujari
- Time zone: UTC+5:30 (IST)
- PIN: 193101
- Literacy: 59.35%

Gulistan is a village located in the region of North Kashmir with administrative headquarters in Baramulla district in the Indian union territory of Jammu and Kashmir and its sub-district units are pinpointed in Baramulla city. The Gulistan word is derived from (Persian: گلستان) which means The Garden of Rose. There are 240 householders residing in Gulistan village which further extends to the total population of 1,634 of which, 825 are males and 809 are females. The literacy rate against the 67.16% of J&K was recorder 59.35% including men and women.
