= The Suicide Shop =

2006 black comedy novel written by Jean Teulé

- Author: Jean Teulé
- Original title: Le Magasin des suicides
- Translator: Sue Dyson
- Language: French
- Publisher: Éditions Julliard
- Publication date: 2006
- Publication place: France
- English publication date: London: Gallic Books: 2008
- Pages: 157
- ISBN: 2-260-01708-8

The Suicide Shop (French: Le Magasin des suicides) is a 2006 black comedy novel by the French writer Jean Teulé. It is set in a future near-apocalyptic city in a world suffering the ravages of severe climate change, where almost everybody is depressed. Symptomatic of this, the pivotal Tuvache family is named after a trio of celebrity suicides – patriarch "Mishima" Tuvache is meant to evoke Yukio Mishima, while their eldest son Vincent Tuvache is named after Vincent van Gogh and their daughter Marilyn Tuvache is meant to mirror Marilyn Monroe. Their younger son Alain is named after British mathematician and cryptographer Alan Turing, but proves to be the white sheep of the family.

== Synopsis ==
Within the aforementioned Tuvache family, which runs a shop for suicide equipment amidst these dire circumstances and instructs customers on their use, Alain is born and almost immediately begins to subvert its melancholic orientation. The family has two other children – the anorexic oldest brother, Vincent, who is the creator of the shop's suicide-oriented hardware, and an equally maladjusted and obese sister, Marilyn, who hates her life. Over time, Mishima, Vincent and Marilyn try to break Alain's independent, optimistic outlook on life but never succeed. As time goes on, first Vincent and Marilyn, and then Mishima, are subverted by their exuberant sibling and offspring, until the Suicide Shop transmutes into a novelty store, sending up its earlier macabre and melancholic orientation. In a twist, however, it is Alain who ends his life at the close of the book, aware that he has provided a raison d'être to reject melancholy and morbidity within his family and the surrounding community.

== Film ==
The novel has been adapted into an animated feature film, The Suicide Shop, directed by Patrice Leconte.

== Reception ==
Mohammed Aïssaoui reviewed the book for Le Figaro, and wrote that Teulé's humour has "the right distance – neither too light in the content, nor too heavy in the drollery –, a nice dose of derision, and the imagination necessary for such a subject."

== English translation ==
- Jean Teule: The Suicide Shop (Translated by Sue Dyer): London: Gallic Books: 2008: ISBN 978-1-906040-90-1

== See also ==
- 2006 in literature
- Contemporary French literature
