= Gulshan Gurbanova =

Gulshan Gurbanova Gülşən Qurbanova
- Born: December 19, 1950; Baku, Azerbaijan SSR, USSR
- Died: November 17, 2006 (aged 55); Baku, Azerbaijan
- Burial place: Yasamal cemetery
- Education: Azerbaijan Institute of Culture and Art
- Occupation: actress
- Father: Agadadash Gurbanov
- Relatives: Hamlet Gurbanov (step brother)

Gulshan Agadadash gizi Gurbanova (Azerbaijani: Gülşən Ağadadaş qızı Qurbanova, December 19, 1950—November 17, 2006) was an Azerbaijani actress, People's Artiste of Azerbaijan (1998).

== Biography ==
Gulshan Gurbanova was born on December 19, 1950 in Baku. In 1974, she graduated from the Azerbaijan Institute of Culture and Art. From 1979 to 2006, she worked at the Azerbaijan State Theatre of Young Spectators.

After leaving the theater, Gulshan Gurbanova was invited to TV channels and performed for a long time in AzTV's "Let's laugh together" project. Long after the AzTV project ended, the actress collaborated with ANS TV for a long time.

On November 17, 2006, while coming home from one of the television programs, Gulshan Gurbanova suddenly had a heart attack for the third time and died at the age of 56 in Baku.

== Awards ==
- People's Artiste of Azerbaijan — May 24, 1998
- Honored Artist of the Azerbaijan SSR
