= Darreh Bagh, Lordegan =

Village in Chaharmahal and Bakhtiari, Iran

Darreh Bagh دره باغ
- Village
- Country: Iran
- Province: Chaharmahal and Bakhtiari
- County: Lordegan
- Bakhsh: Manj
- Rural District: Manj

Population (2006)
  - Total: 117
- Time zone: UTC+3:30 (IRST)
  - Summer (DST): UTC+4:30 (IRDT)

Darreh Bagh (Persian: دره باغ, also Romanized as Darreh Bāgh) is a village in Manj Rural District, Manj District, Lordegan County, Chaharmahal and Bakhtiari Province, Iran. At the 2006 census, its population was 117, in 23 families. The village is populated by Lurs.
