= Golestan, Hormozgan =

Golestan گلستان
- Village
- Location within Iran
- Coordinates: 27°29′39″N 56°52′26″E
- Country: Iran
- Province: Hormozgan
- County: Bandar Abbas
- Bakhsh: Central
- Rural District: Isin

Population (2006)
  - Total: 50
- Time zone: UTC+3:30 (IRST)
  - Summer (DST): UTC+4:30 (IRDT)

Golestan (Persian: گلستان, also Romanized as Golestān) is a village in Isin Rural District, in the Central District of Bandar Abbas County, Hormozgan Province, Iran. At the 2006 census, its population was 50, in 17 families.
