= Golestan, Sirjan =

Golestan گلستان
- Village
- Location within Iran
- Coordinates: 29°08′22″N 55°43′26″E
- Country: Iran
- Province: Kerman
- County: Sirjan
- Bakhsh: Central
- Rural District: Golestan

Population (2006)
  - Total: 61
- Time zone: UTC+3:30 (IRST)
  - Summer (DST): UTC+4:30 (IRDT)

Golestan (Persian: گلستان, also Romanized as Golestān) is a village in Golestan Rural District, in the Central District of Sirjan County, Kerman Province, Iran. At the 2006 census, its population was 61, in 16 families.
