= Bab ol Bagh =

Village in Isfahan province, Iran

Bab ol Bagh Persian: باب الباغ
- Village
- Location within Iran
- Coordinates: 33°20′06″N 52°30′54″E
- Country: Iran
- Province: Isfahan
- County: Ardestan
- District: Zavareh
- Rural District: Sofla

Population (2016)
  - Total: 78
- Time zone: UTC+3:30 (IRST)

Bab ol Bagh (Persian: باب الباغ) (Note: Also romanized as Bāb ol Bāgh; also known as Dar Bāgh (درباغ), Dar-e Bāgh, and Darreh Bāgh) is a village in Sofla Rural District of Zavareh District in Ardestan County, Isfahan province, Iran.

== Demographics ==
=== Population ===
At the time of the 2006 National Census, the village's population was 252 in 85 households, when it was in Kachu Rural District of the Central District. The following census in 2011 counted 133 people in 56 households. The 2016 census measured the population of the village as 78 people in 36 households.

In 2023, the village was transferred to Sofla Rural District in Zavareh District.
