= Golestan Sara =

Golestan Sara گلستان سرا
- Village
- Location within Iran
- Coordinates: 37°02′14″N 49°47′31″E
- Country: Iran
- Province: Gilan
- County: Siahkal
- Bakhsh: Central
- Rural District: Khara Rud

Population (2016)
  - Total: 40
- Time zone: UTC+3:30 (IRST)

Golestan Sara (Persian: گلستان سرا, also Romanized as Golestān Sarā) is a village in Khara Rud Rural District, in the Central District of Siahkal County, Gilan Province, Iran.

At the time of the 2006 National Census, the village's population was 64 in 17 households. The following census in 2011 counted 46 people in 18 households. The 2016 census measured the population of the village as 40 people in 18 households.
