= Aliabad-e Enqelab, Kerman =

Aliabad-e Enqelab علي ابادانقلاب
- Village
- Location within Iran
- Coordinates: 30°22′58″N 56°02′49″E
- Country: Iran
- Province: Kerman
- County: Rafsanjan
- Bakhsh: Central
- Rural District: Qasemabad

Population (2006)
  - Total: 1,404
- Time zone: UTC+3:30 (IRST)
  - Summer (DST): UTC+4:30 (IRDT)

Aliabad-e Enqelab (Persian: علي ابادانقلاب, also Romanized as ‘Alīābād-e Enqelāb) is a village in Qasemabad Rural District, in the Central District of Rafsanjan County, Kerman Province, Iran. At the 2006 census, its population was 1,404, in 337 families.
