= Keep Going =

2018 Belgian-French film

- Directed by: Joachim Lafosse
- Screenplay by: Joachim Lafosse; Thomas Van Zuylen
- Starring: Virginie Efira; Kacey Mottet-Klein
- Cinematography: Jean-François Hensgens
- Edited by: Yann Dedet
- Release date: 2018
- Language: French

Keep Going (French: Continuer) is a 2018 Belgian-French drama film co-written and directed by Joachim Lafosse.

Based on the novel Continuer by Laurent Mauvignier, the film premiered at the Giornate degli Autori section of the 75th Venice International Film Festival.

== Cast ==
- Virginie Efira as Sybille
- Kacey Mottet-Klein as Samuel
- Diego Martín as Juan
- Mairambek Kozhoev as Mairambek
- Damira Ripert as Jamila

== Reception ==
On Rotten Tomatoes, the film has an approval rating of 100% based on 5 reviews.
