= Photo Kathmandu =

Photography festival in Nepal

Photo Kathmandu is a biennial international photography festival held in Patan, Nepal, and organised by photo.circle, a Kathmandu based cultural organisation, and Shikshya Foundation Nepal.

The festival, managed with the help of local volunteers, features print exhibitions, workshops, talks and panel discussions, a mixed-media residency, slideshow nights, portfolio reviews and an arts and education programme. It distinguished itself by being an open-air festival, anchored in the local communities of Patan and Kathmandu, and using public spaces such as courtyards, squares, alleys and drinking fountains to exhibit photographic bodies of work and to present slideshows. At each festival, Photo Kathmandu recognises individuals who have helped the growth of Nepali photography with an Award for Excellence.

== History ==
The first edition of Photo Kathmandu followed the April 2015 Nepal earthquake, during the 2015 Nepal blockade, in an effort to shift international attention back to Nepal. The festival was held in the historical city of Patan.

The second edition of Photo Kathmandu took place in 2016, before going biennial. The 2018 third edition saw the creation of the South Asia Incubator 1, a programme where young and up-and-coming photography practitioners from South Asia could meet and discuss their work with each other and various mentors. Due to the COVID-19 pandemic, the 2020 edition was held virtually and spread over a whole year, from 3 December 2020 to 2 December 2021.

The festival has exhibited works from artists such as Philip Blenkinsop, Amar Kanwar, Sohrab Hura Kevin Bubriski, Munem Wasif, and Tasneem Alsultan.

=== Themes ===
==== 2015: Time ====
Following the 2015 earthquakes, the first edition of Photo Kathmandu looked at Nepal's past, present and future.

==== 2016: Resilience ====
Twenty years after the end of the Nepalese Civil War, the 2016 edition focused on stories of resilience from across South Asia, showcasing and celebrating how people face and overcome hardship. A guest curator, Tanvi Mishra, co-curated the festival's exhibitions.

==== 2018: Gender, patriarchy, power, identity and sexuality ====
The 2018 edition was inaugurated by Tham Maya Thapa, Minister for Women, Children and Senior Citizens. Focusing on the topics of gender, patriarchy, power, identity and sexuality, the festival included various print exhibitions including Bunu Dhungana's Confrontations engaging "with taboo aspects of womanhood" in Nepali society. Curator Anshika Varma produced a group exhibition by artists "who posit the body as a vehicle for performing gender". The digital archive Nepal Picture Library and its curator Diwas Raja Kc brought the "Feminist Memory Project" which "provided a much-needed snapshot of the history of feminist movement in Nepal".

In light of its curatorial framework and in the context of the #MeToo movement in South Asia, Photo Kathmandu was one of the first institutions to take action by publishing, and making its participants adhere to, a "No Bullshit - Code of Conduct".

== Award of Excellence ==
At each festival, Photo Kathmandu recognises individuals who have helped the growth of Nepali photography.

- 2015: Mani Lama.
- 2016: Shreedhar Lal Manandhar and Kiran Shrestha.
- 2018: Shahidul Alam. Jury members Bikas Rauniar, Bikas Karki and Sagar Shrestha unanimously awarded Alam, acknowledging his "instrumental contribution towards the development of Nepali photography and journalism, and his role as an enabler of Photo Kathmandu".
