= Aliabad-e Enqelab, Qom =

Village in Qom province, Iran

Aliabad-e Enqelab Persian: علي ابادانقلاب
- Village
- Location within Iran
- Coordinates: 34°48′33″N 50°28′18″E
- Country: Iran
- Province: Qom
- County: Jafarabad
- District: Central
- Rural District: Baqerabad

Population (2016)
  - Total: 1,350
- Time zone: UTC+3:30 (IRST)

Aliabad-e Enqelab (Persian: علي ابادانقلاب) (Note: Also romanized as ‘Alīābād-e Enqelāb; also known as ‘Alīābād) is a village in Baqerabad Rural District of the Central District (Note: Formerly Jafarabad District of Qom County) in Jafarabad County, Qom province, Iran.

== Demographics ==
=== Population ===
At the time of the 2006 National Census, the village's population was 1,108 in 238 households, when it was in Jafarabad Rural District of Jafarabad District (Note: Renamed the Central District of Jafarabad County) in Qom County. The following census in 2011 counted 1,251 people in 317 households. The 2016 census measured the population of the village as 1,350 people in 364 households.

In 2021, the district was separated from the county in the establishment of Jafarabad County and renamed the Central District. Aliabad-e Enqelab was transferred to Baqerabad Rural District created in the same district.
