= Golestan, Qom =

Village in Qom province, Iran

Golestan Persian: گلستان
- Village
- Location within Iran
- Coordinates: 34°39′08″N 50°28′50″E
- Country: Iran
- Province: Qom
- County: Jafarabad
- District: Central
- Rural District: Baqerabad

Population (2016)
  - Total: 53
- Time zone: UTC+3:30 (IRST)

Golestan (Persian: گلستان) (Note: Also romanized as Golestān; also known as Gulistān) is a village in Baqerabad Rural District of the Central District (Note: Formerly Jafarabad District of Qom County) in Jafarabad County, Qom province, Iran.

== Demographics ==
=== Population ===
At the time of the 2006 National Census, the village's population was 34 in nine households, when it was in Jafarabad Rural District of Jafarabad District (Note: Renamed the Central District of Jafarabad County) in Qom County. The following census in 2011 counted 13 people in six households. The 2016 census measured the population of the village as 53 people in 16 households.

In 2021, the district was separated from the county in the establishment of Jafarabad County and renamed the Central District. Golestan was transferred to Baqerabad Rural District created in the same district.
