= Darbagh, Hormozgan =

Darbagh درباغ
- Village
- Location within Iran
- Coordinates: 27°11′16″N 56°57′46″E
- Country: Iran
- Province: Hormozgan
- County: Minab
- Bakhsh: Central
- Rural District: Band-e Zarak

Population (2006)
  - Total: 95
- Time zone: UTC+3:30 (IRST)
  - Summer (DST): UTC+4:30 (IRDT)

Darbagh (Persian: درباغ, also Romanized as Darbāgh and Dar Bāgh) is a village in Band-e Zarak Rural District, in the Central District of Minab County, Hormozgan Province, Iran. At the 2006 census, its population was 95, in 24 families.
