= Greta Scarano =

Italian actress (born 1986)

- Scarano in 2026
- Born: 27 August 1986 (age 40); Rome, Italy
- Occupation: Actress

Greta Scarano (born 27 August 1986) is an Italian television, stage, film actress, and director.

== Career ==
Born in Rome, Scarano made her professional debut in the TV series RIS Delitti imperfetti. Between 2008 and 2009, she played Sabrina Guarini in the Rai 3 soap opera Un Posto al Sole. Between 2012 and 2015, she played the Inspector Francesca Leoni in the Canale 5 crime series Squadra antimafia – Palermo oggi.

For her performance in the film Without Pity, Scarano won the Guglielmo Biraghi Award at the 70th Silver Ribbon Awards in 2015. In 2016, she was awarded the Nastro d'Argento for Best Supporting Actress and the Ciak d'oro as discovery of the year for Stefano Sollima's Suburra. In 2025, she made her feature directorial debut with Siblings, which got her a Nastro d'Argento for best new director.

== Filmography ==
=== Film ===
Year	Title	Role(s)	Notes
2011	Qualche nuvola	Cinzia	
2014	Without Pity	Tania	
2015	Suburra	Viola	
2016	La verità sta in cielo	Sabrina Minardi	
2017	I Can Quit Whenever I Want: Masterclass	Paola Coletti	
2017	I Can Quit Whenever I Want: Ad Honorem	Paola Coletti	
2017	Diva!	Valentina Cortese	
2019	The App	Ofelia	
2021	Superheroes	Pilar	
2022	The Perfect Dinner	Consuelo Banega	
2023	The Best Days	Daniela	
2023	Nuovo Olimpo	Giulia	
2025	Siblings	–	Directorial debut
2025	Damned If You Do, Damned If You Don't	Sofia	

=== Television ===
Year	Title	Role(s)	Notes
2007–2008	Un posto al sole	Sabrina Guarini	Recurring role (season 12)
2008	RIS Delitti imperfetti	Giada Maccese	Episode: "Delitto in facoltà"
2008	Don Matteo	Elena	Episode: "Una dura prova per Don Matteo"
2008–2010	Romanzo criminale	Angelina	Main role
2009	Distretto di Polizia	Livia Lamartire	Episode: "Guarda me"
2011	I liceali	Susanna Gargione	Main role (season 3)
2011–2012	R.I.S. Roma – Delitti imperfetti	Giordana Ravelli	Recurring role (season 2); guest (season 3)
2012–2015	Squadra antimafia	Francesca Leoni	Main role (seasons 4-7)
2013	L'ultimo papa re	Teresa Ferri	Television film
2014	In Treatment	Elisa	Recurring role
2018	La linea verticale	Elena	Main role
2019	The Name of the Rose	Anna / Margherita	Main role
2021	Speravo de morì prima	Ilary Blasi	Main role
2021	Inspector Montalbano	Antonia Nicoletti	Episode: "Il metodo Catalanotti"
2021	Chiamami ancora amore	Anna Fanti	Lead role
2022	Circeo	Teresa Capogrossi	Main role
