= Golshan, Hormozgan =

Golshan گلشن
- Village
- Location within Iran
- Coordinates: 26°50′40″N 54°05′46″E
- Country: Iran
- Province: Hormozgan
- County: Bandar Lengeh
- Bakhsh: Shibkaveh
- Rural District: Bandar Charak

Population (2006)
  - Total: 203
- Time zone: UTC+3:30 (IRST)
  - Summer (DST): UTC+4:30 (IRDT)

Golshan (Persian: گلشن; also known as Gul Shān) is a village in Bandar Charak Rural District, Shibkaveh District, Bandar Lengeh County, Hormozgan Province, Iran. At the 2006 census, its population was 203, in 36 families.
