= Darreh Bagh, Kuhrang =

Darreh Bagh دره باغ
- Village
- Location within Iran
- Coordinates: 32°20′58″N 49°57′56″E
- Country: Iran
- Province: Chaharmahal and Bakhtiari
- County: Kuhrang
- Bakhsh: Bazoft
- Rural District: Bazoft

Population (2006)
  - Total: 29
- Time zone: UTC+3:30 (IRST)
  - Summer (DST): UTC+4:30 (IRDT)

Darreh Bagh (Persian: دره باغ, also Romanized as Darreh Bāgh; also known as Darrehbāgh) is a village in Bazoft Rural District, Bazoft District, Kuhrang County, Chaharmahal and Bakhtiari Province, Iran. At the 2006 census, its population was 29, in 6 families. The village is populated by Lurs.
