= Gülsen Tuncer =

Turkish actor (1945–2026)

Gülsen Tuncer (20 October 1945 – 17 September 2026) was a Turkish actress known for Aşk-ı Memnu, O Hayat Benim, and Mrs. Fazilet and Her Daughters.

== Life and career ==
Tuncer was born in Adana on 20 October 1945. She graduated from the Theater Department of the Istanbul Municipal Conservatory. Tuncer began her professional theatre career in 1968 with the play "Zilli Zarife", staged by the Gülriz Sururi-Engin Cezzar Theatre. She was married to Engin Ayça, a director, screenwriter and cinematographer. Tuncer died from brain cancer on 17 September 2026, at the age of 80, and was buried in Istanbul following a funeral at Şişli Mosque.
