= Rigestan Rural District =

Rural district in Isfahan province, Iran

Rigestan Rural District Persian: دهستان ريگستان
- Rural District
- Location within Iran
- Coordinates: 33°45′N 52°36′E
- Country: Iran
- Province: Isfahan
- County: Ardestan
- District: Zavareh
- Established: 1987
- Capital: Telkabad

Population (2016)
  - Total: 3,953
- Time zone: UTC+3:30 (IRST)

Rigestan Rural District (Persian: دهستان ريگستان) is in Zavareh District of Ardestan County, Isfahan province, Iran. Its capital is the village of Telkabad.

== Demographics ==
=== Population ===
At the time of the 2006 National Census, the rural district's population was 4,157 in 1,102 households. There were 4,040 inhabitants in 1,179 households at the following census of 2011. The 2016 census measured the population of the rural district as 3,953 in 1,259 households. The most populous of its 41 villages was Telkabad, with 1,469 people.

=== Other villages in the rural district ===
- Ahmadabad
- Amirabad
- Amiran
- Eslamabad
- Golestan-e Mehdi
- Golzar-e Mohammad
- Kochur Sotaq
