= Darb Bagh =

Darb Bagh دربباغ
- Village
- Location within Iran
- Coordinates: 31°27′18″N 54°12′50″E
- Country: Iran
- Province: Yazd
- County: Taft
- Bakhsh: Nir
- Rural District: Zardeyn

Population (2006)
  - Total: 76
- Time zone: UTC+3:30 (IRST)
  - Summer (DST): UTC+4:30 (IRDT)

Darb Bagh (Persian: دربباغ, also Romanized as Darb Bāgh and Darb-e Bāgh; also known as Darbāgh and Darreh Bāgh) is a village in Zardeyn Rural District, Nir District, Taft County, Yazd Province, Iran. At the 2006 census, its population was 76, in 34 families.
