= Ursula Meier =

French-Swiss film director and screenwriter

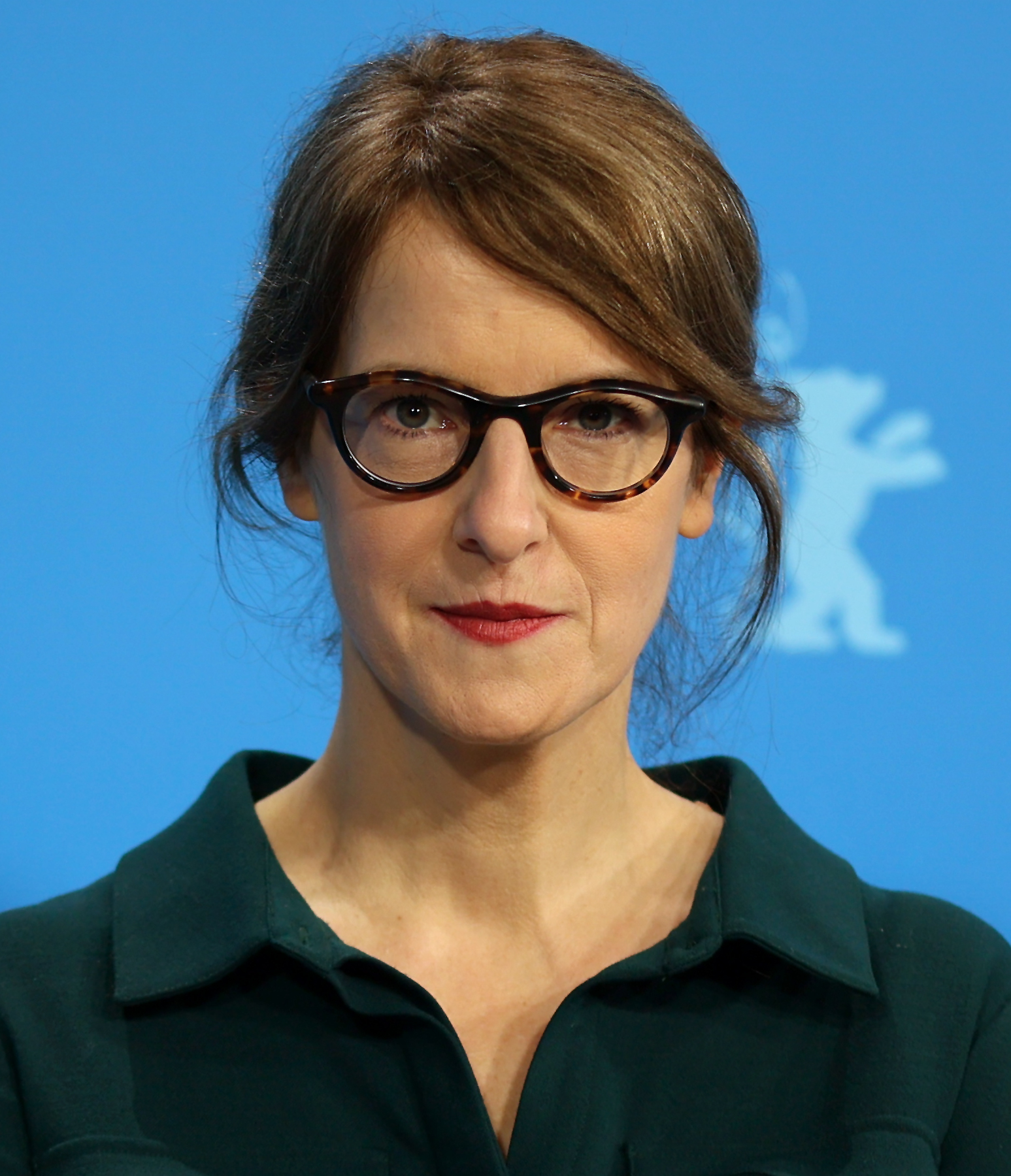
- Meier in 2022
- Born: 24 June 1971 (age 55); Besançon, France
- Occupations: Film director, screenwriter

Ursula Meier (born 24 June 1971) is a French-Swiss film director and screenwriter.

== Career ==
A native of Besançon, the capital of the Franche-Comté region in eastern France, near the Swiss border, Ursula Meier graduated from Belgium's Institut des Arts de Diffusion [Institute of Visual Arts] and served as assistant director to the Swiss auteur, Alain Tanner, on his films Fourbi (Gear) (1996) and Jonas et Lila, à demain (Jonas and Lila, 'Till Tomorrow) (1999).

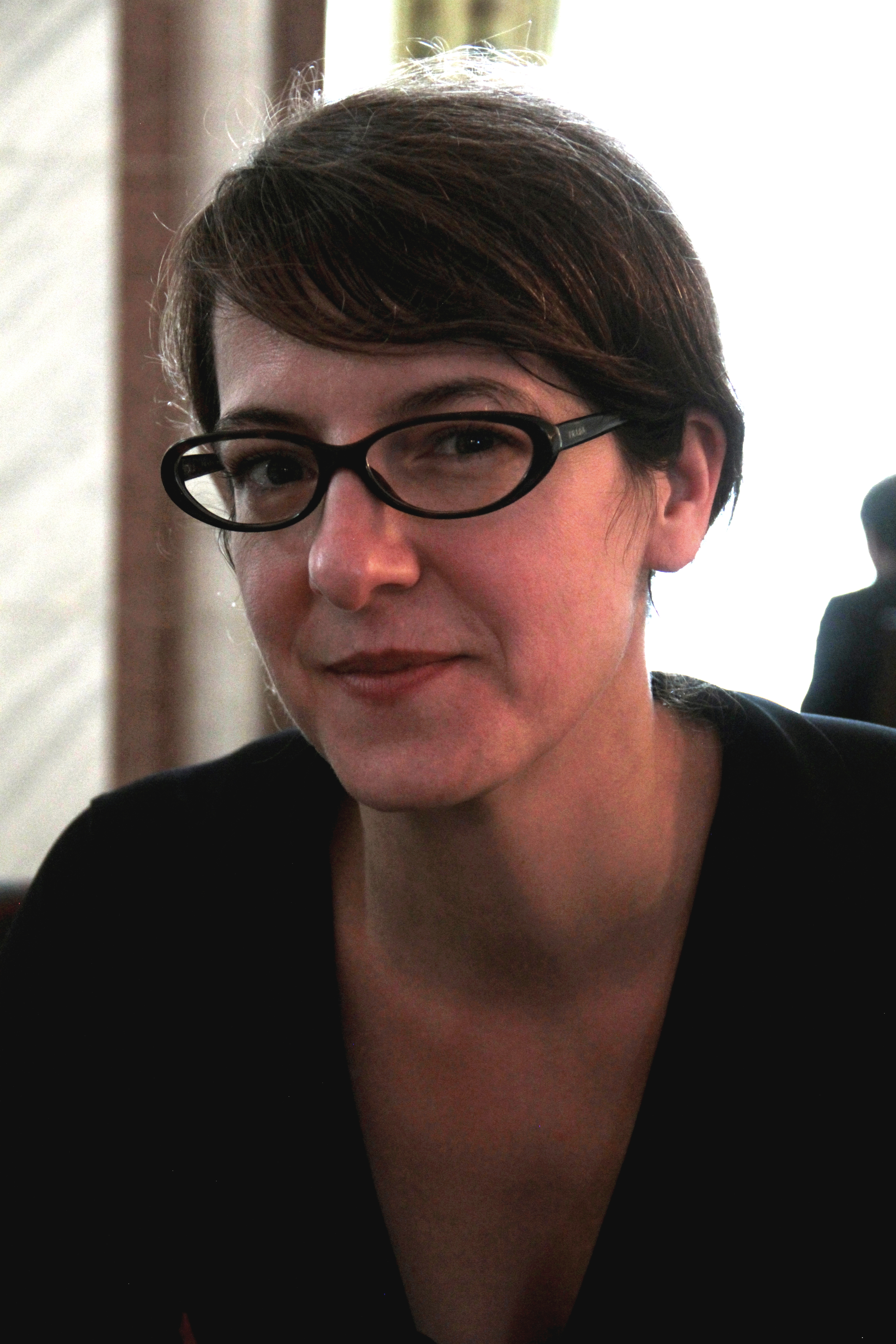
Meier in 2012

She won her first major film award for the 1998 short, Des heures sans sommeil (Sleepless), which received the Special Jury Prize at the Festival International du Court-Métrage de Clermont-Ferrand as well as the International Grand Prize at the 1998 Toronto International Film Festival and a Best Short Fiction Film nomination at the Molodist International Film Festival in Kyiv. In 2002, her film Tous à table (Table Manners), which had already won the Audience Award and the Press Award at the 2001 Clermont-Ferrand Festival, as well as the Best French-Language Short Film award at the 2001 Créteil International Women's Film Festival, received a Swiss Film Prize nomination for Best Short Film.

In 2003, Ursula Meier served as a member of the jury at the Brest European Short Film Festival and won the Cinema Prize – Feature Film award at Portugal's Avanca Film Festival as well as a nomination for the Swiss Film Prize as best feature film for her made-for-TV movie, Strong Shoulders. In April, with the selection of Strong Shoulders for New York City's New Directors/New Films Festival at the Museum of Modern Art and Film Society of Lincoln Center, she made the journey to introduce the film and participate in question-and-answer sessions.

Six years later, Home was also selected for New Directors/New Films and, in April 2009, she once again made appearances at the Museum of Modern Art and The Walter Reade Theatre, introducing the New York premiere of the film. The film had premiered as a special screening in the Critics' Week section at the Cannes Film Festival in May 2008.

Her 2012 film L'enfant d'en haut premiered in competition at the 62nd Berlin International Film Festival, where it won the Special Award - Silver Bear. It has also been selected as the Swiss entry for the Best Foreign Language Oscar at the 85th Academy Awards, making the January shortlist.

In 2013 she was a member of the jury at the 35th Moscow International Film Festival.

She took part in the collective film Bridges of Sarajevo, together with twelve other renowned directors. The film premiered within the Special Screenings at Cannes Film Festival in 2014.

In 2018, she was the president of the Jury for the Caméra d'Or, the award for the best first feature at Cannes Film Festival, and was the Godmother of the Locarno International Film Festival's signing the SWAN pledge 5050x2020.

The Line (La Ligne), her next feature, premiered again in the competition at Berlin Film Festival in 2022.

== Filmography (as screenwriter and director) ==
=== Feature films ===
- 2000: Autour de Pinget (About Pinget) (documentary film)
- 2002: Strong Shoulders (made-for-TV movie), starring Louise Szpindel and Jean-François Stévenin
- 2008: Home, starring Isabelle Huppert and Olivier Gourmet
- 2012: L'enfant d'en haut (Sister)
- 2014: Bridges of Sarajevo, documentary
- 2017: Shock Waves – Diary of My Mind, part of the Shock Waves mini-series
- 2022: The Line (La Ligne)

=== Short films ===
- 1994: À corps perdu (To the Lost Body) (with writer and co-director Cédric Havenith)
- 1998: Des heures sans sommeil (Sleepless)
- 2001: Tous à table (Table Manners)
- 2015: Kacey Mottet Klein, Naissance d'un acteur (Kacey Mottet Klein, Birth of an actor), short film

== Awards and nominations (selection) ==
For Kacey Mottet Klein, Naissance d'un acteur (Kacey Mottet Klein, Birth of an actor):

- Swiss Film Award for best short film
- Cork International Film Festival, Grand Prix Award for Short Documentary
- São Paulo International Short Film Festival, Audience Choice - Top 10 International short film
- Plein la Bobine - Festival International de Cinéma Jeunes Publics du Massif du Sancy, Prix du Jury professionnel
- Chicago Int. Children's Film Festival, Youth Jury Prize - Live-action Short Film

For Home:

- Best Director award at the Festival du Film Francophone d'Angoulême
- Swiss Film Award for best feature film as well as best screenplay (with Antoine Jaccoud)
- César for Best first feature film (nomination)
- Best Film at Argentina's Mar del Plata Film Festival (nomination)
- Festival International du Cinéma d'Auteur de Rabat, Best Screenplay (with Antoine Jaccoud)
- Festival du film francophone Athens, Grand Prize of the city of Athènes
- Festival Internacional de Cine de Mar del Plata, ADF Award Best Photographer (Agnès Godard)
- Reykjavik International Film Festival, FIPRESCI Award
- Paris, SACD Société des Auteurs et Compositeurs Dramatiques, Prix SACD Nouveau Talent Cinéma
- Mostra internacional de films de dones, Prix du public
- Flying Broom Women's Film Festival, FIPRESCI Award

For L'enfant d'en haut (Sister):

- Berlin International Film Festival, Silver Bear - Special Award
- Swiss Film Award for best feature film, best screenplay (with Antoine Jaccoud) and best actor (Kasey Mottet Klein)
- César Best male newcomer (Kacey Mottet Klein, Nomination)
- Trophées Francophones du Cinéma Dakar, Best feature film
- Zurich Film Award
- Athens International Film Festival, The Golden Athena Award
- Denver Film Festival, Krzysztof Kieslowski Award for Best Feature Film
- Trento Film Festival, "Luciano Emmer" Critics Award
- Ljubljana International Film Festival, Prix FIPRESCI
- Fünf Seen Filmfestival, Fünf Seen Filmpreis
- Sevilla Festival de Cine Europeo, Jury Award for Best Cinematography (Agnès Godard)
- Festival du Film de Cabourg, Best actrice (Léa Seydoux)
