= Darreh Bagh, Azna =

Darreh Bagh دره باغ
- Village
- Location within Iran
- Coordinates: 33°34′52″N 49°36′43″E
- Country: Iran
- Province: Lorestan
- County: Azna
- Bakhsh: Japelaq
- Rural District: Japelaq-e Sharqi

Population (2006)
  - Total: 140
- Time zone: UTC+3:30 (IRST)
  - Summer (DST): UTC+4:30 (IRDT)

Darreh Bagh (Persian: دره باغ, also Romanized as Darreh Bāgh; also known as Dār Bāgh and Dār-i-Bāgh) is a village in Japelaq-e Sharqi Rural District, Japelaq District, Azna County, Lorestan Province, Iran. At the 2006 census, its population was 140, in 33 families.
