= Dar Bagh, Shahr-e Babak =

Dar Bagh درباغ
- Village
- Location within Iran
- Coordinates: 30°27′30″N 55°20′16″E
- Country: Iran
- Province: Kerman
- County: Shahr-e Babak
- Bakhsh: Central
- Rural District: Madvarat

Population (2006)
  - Total: 74
- Time zone: UTC+3:30 (IRST)
  - Summer (DST): UTC+4:30 (IRDT)

Dar Bagh (Persian: درباغ, also Romanized as Dar Bāgh; also known as Darreh Bāgh and Deh Bāgh) is a village in Madvarat Rural District, in the Central District of Shahr-e Babak County, Kerman Province, Iran. At the 2006 census, its population was 74, in 21 families.
