= Zavareh District =

District in Isfahan province, Iran

Zavareh District Persian: بخش زواره
- District
- Location within Iran
- Coordinates: 33°45′N 52°39′E
- Country: Iran
- Province: Isfahan
- County: Ardestan
- Established: 1995
- Capital: Zavareh

Population (2016)
  - Total: 12,678
- Time zone: UTC+3:30 (IRST)

Zavareh District (Persian: بخش زواره) is in Ardestan County, Isfahan province, Iran. Its capital is the city of Zavareh.

== Demographics ==
=== Population ===
At the time of the 2006 National Census, the district's population was 12,747 in 3,629 households. The following census in 2011 counted 12,394 people in 3,788 households. The 2016 census measured the population of the district as 12,678 inhabitants in 4,180 households.

=== Administrative divisions ===
Zavareh District Population
Administrative Divisions	2006	2011	2016
Rigestan RD	4,157	4,040	3,953
Sofla RD	784	540	405
Zavareh (city)	7,806	7,814	8,320
Total	12,747	12,394	12,678
RD = Rural District
