= Alvirabad =

Village in Qom province, Iran

Alvirabad Persian: الويراباد
- Village
- Location within Iran
- Coordinates: 34°49′00″N 50°32′08″E
- Country: Iran
- Province: Qom
- County: Jafarabad
- District: Central
- Rural District: Jafarabad

Population (2016)
  - Total: 537
- Time zone: UTC+3:30 (IRST)

Alvirabad (Persian: الويراباد) (Note: Also romanized as Alvīrābād) is a village in Jafarabad Rural District of the Central District (Note: Formerly Jafarabad District of Qom County) in Jafarabad County, Qom province, Iran.

== Demographics ==
=== Population ===
At the time of the 2006 National Census, the village's population was 462 in 100 households, when it was in Jafarabad District (Note: Renamed the Central District of Jafarabad County) of Qom County. The following census in 2011 counted 509 people in 132 households. The 2016 census measured the population of the village as 537 people in 150 households.

In 2021, the district was separated from the county in the establishment of Jafarabad County and renamed the Central District.
