= Jafarabad, Jafarabad =

Village in Qom province, Iran

Jafarabad Persian: جعفراباد
- Village
- Location within Iran
- Coordinates: 34°47′19″N 50°34′28″E
- Country: Iran
- Province: Qom
- County: Jafarabad
- District: Central
- Rural District: Jafarabad

Population (2016)
  - Total: 919
- Time zone: UTC+3:30 (IRST)

Jafarabad (Persian: جعفراباد) (Note: Also romanized as Ja‘farābād) is a village in, and the capital of, Jafarabad Rural District in the Central District (Note: Formerly Jafarabad District of Qom County) of Jafarabad County, Qom province, Iran. The previous capital of the rural district was the village of Gazeran, now the city of Jafariyeh.

== Demographics ==
=== Population ===
At the time of the 2006 National Census, the village's population was 845 in 190 households, when it was in Jafarabad District (Note: Renamed the Central District of Jafarabad County) of Qom County. The following census in 2011 counted 707 people in 189 households. The 2016 census measured the population of the village as 919 people in 279 households.

In 2021, the district was separated from the county in the establishment of Jafarabad County and renamed the Central District.
