= Pestagan =

Village in Qom province, Iran

Pestagan Persian: پستگان
- Village
- Location within Iran
- Coordinates: 34°48′14″N 50°32′57″E
- Country: Iran
- Province: Qom
- County: Jafarabad
- District: Central
- Rural District: Jafarabad

Population (2016)
  - Total: 862
- Time zone: UTC+3:30 (IRST)

Pestagan (Persian: پستگان) (Note: Also romanized as Pestagān; also known as Pestakān) is a village in Jafarabad Rural District of the Central District (Note: Formerly Jafarabad District of Qom County) in Jafarabad County, Qom province, Iran.

== Demographics ==
=== Population ===
At the time of the 2006 National Census, the village's population was 714 in 134 households, when it was in Jafarabad District (Note: Renamed the Central District of Jafarabad County) of Qom County. The following census in 2011 counted 913 people in 199 households. The 2016 census measured the population of the village as 862 people in 221 households.

In 2021, the district was separated from the county in the establishment of Jafarabad County and renamed the Central District.
