= Sadabad, Qom =

Village in Qom province, Iran

Sadabad Persian: سعداباد
- Village
- Location within Iran
- Coordinates: 34°51′34″N 50°36′36″E
- Country: Iran
- Province: Qom
- County: Jafarabad
- District: Central
- Rural District: Jafarabad

Population (2016)
  - Total: 64
- Time zone: UTC+3:30 (IRST)

Sadabad (Persian: سعداباد) (Note: Also romanized as Sa‘dābād; also known as Sa‘īdābād, Şeydābād, and Seyyedābād) is a village in Jafarabad Rural District of the Central District (Note: Formerly Jafarabad District of Qom County) in Jafarabad County, Qom province, Iran.

== Demographics ==
=== Population ===
At the time of the 2006 National Census, the village's population was 57 in nine households, when it was in Jafarabad District (Note: Renamed the Central District of Jafarabad County) of Qom County. The following census in 2011 counted 47 people in 13 households. The 2016 census measured the population of the village as 64 people in 18 households.

In 2021, the district was separated from the county in the establishment of Jafarabad County and renamed the Central District.
