= Dowlatabad, Jafarabad (east) =

Village in Qom province, Iran

Dowlatabad Persian: دولت اباد
- Village
- Location within Iran
- Coordinates: 34°49′03″N 50°35′02″E
- Country: Iran
- Province: Qom
- County: Jafarabad
- District: Central
- Rural District: Jafarabad

Population (2016)
  - Total: Below reporting threshold
- Time zone: UTC+3:30 (IRST)

Dowlatabad (Persian: دولت اباد) (Note: Also romanized as Dowlatābād) is a village in Jafarabad Rural District of the Central District (Note: Formerly Jafarabad District of Qom County) in Jafarabad County, Qom province, Iran.

== Demographics ==
=== Population ===
At the time of the 2006 National Census, the village's population was 23 in four households, when it was in Jafarabad District (Note: Renamed the Central District of Jafarabad County) of Qom County. The following censuses in 2011 and 2016 counted a population below the reporting threshold.

In 2021, the district was separated from the county in the establishment of Jafarabad County and renamed the Central District.
