= Mahmudabad, Qom =

Village in Qom province, Iran

Mahmudabad Persian: محمودآباد
- Village
- Location within Iran
- Coordinates: 34°48′27″N 50°36′50″E
- Country: Iran
- Province: Qom
- County: Jafarabad
- District: Central
- Rural District: Jafarabad

Population (2016)
  - Total: 462
- Time zone: UTC+3:30 (IRST)

Mahmudabad (Persian: محموداباد) (Note: Also romanized as Maḩmūdābād) is a village in Jafarabad Rural District of the Central District (Note: Formerly Jafarabad District of Qom County) in Jafarabad County, Qom province, Iran.

== Demographics ==
=== Population ===
At the time of the 2006 National Census, the village's population was 446 in 122 households, when it was in Jafarabad District (Note: Renamed the Central District of Jafarabad County) of Qom County. The following census in 2011 counted 534 people in 156 households. The 2016 census measured the population of the village as 462 people in 137 households.

In 2021, the district was separated from the county in the establishment of Jafarabad County and renamed the Central District.
