= Moqbelabad, Qom =

Village in Qom province, Iran

Moqbelabad Persian: مقبل اباد
- Village
- Location within Iran
- Coordinates: 34°48′38″N 50°34′07″E
- Country: Iran
- Province: Qom
- County: Jafarabad
- District: Central
- Rural District: Jafarabad

Population (2016)
  - Total: 55
- Time zone: UTC+3:30 (IRST)

Moqbelabad (Persian: مقبل اباد) (Note: Also romanized as Moqbelābād) is a village in Jafarabad Rural District of the Central District (Note: Formerly Jafarabad District of Qom County) in Jafarabad County, Qom province, Iran.

== Demographics ==
=== Population ===
At the time of the 2006 National Census, the village's population was 54 in nine households, when it was in Jafarabad District (Note: Renamed the Central District of Jafarabad County) of Qom County. The following census in 2011 counted 46 people in nine households. The 2016 census measured the population of the village as 55 people in 14 households.

In 2021, the district was separated from the county in the establishment of Jafarabad County and renamed the Central District.
