= Karimabad, Qom =

Village in Qom province, Iran

Karimabad Persian: كريم اباد
- Village
- Location within Iran
- Coordinates: 34°48′27″N 50°35′05″E
- Country: Iran
- Province: Qom
- County: Jafarabad
- District: Central
- Rural District: Jafarabad

Population (2016)
  - Total: 79
- Time zone: UTC+3:30 (IRST)

Karimabad (Persian: كريم اباد) (Note: Also romanized as Karīmābād) is a village in Jafarabad Rural District of the Central District (Note: Formerly Jafarabad District of Qom County) in Jafarabad County, Qom province, Iran.

== Demographics ==
=== Population ===
At the time of the 2006 National Census, the village's population was 97 in 21 households, when it was in Jafarabad District (Note: Renamed the Central District of Jafarabad County) of Qom County. The following census in 2011 counted 89 people in 24 households. The 2016 census measured the population of the village as 79 people in 23 households.

In 2021, the district was separated from the county in the establishment of Jafarabad County and renamed the Central District.
