= Abdolabad-e Pain =

Village in Qom province, Iran

Abdolabad-e Pain Persian: عبدل ابادپايين
- Village
- Location within Iran
- Coordinates: 34°48′37″N 50°38′06″E
- Country: Iran
- Province: Qom
- County: Jafarabad
- District: Central
- Rural District: Jafarabad

Population (2016)
  - Total: 71
- Time zone: UTC+3:30 (IRST)

Abdolabad-e Pain (Persian: عبدل ابادپايين) (Note: Also romanized as ‘Abdolābād-e Pā’īn; also known as ‘Abbdollāhābād and ‘Abdollāhābād)) is a village in Jafarabad Rural District of the Central District (Note: Formerly Jafarabad District of Qom County) in Jafarabad County, Qom province, Iran.

== Demographics ==
=== Population ===
At the time of the 2006 National Census, the village's population was 19 in four households, when it was in Jafarabad District (Note: Renamed the Central District of Jafarabad County) of Qom County. The following census in 2011 counted 91 people in 30 households. The 2016 census measured the population of the village as 71 people in 19 households.

In 2021, the district was separated from the county in the establishment of Jafarabad County and renamed the Central District.
