= Heydarabad, Qom =

Village in Qom province, Iran

Heydarabad Persian: حيدراباد
- Village
- Location within Iran
- Coordinates: 34°47′34″N 50°36′09″E
- Country: Iran
- Province: Qom
- County: Jafarabad
- District: Central
- Rural District: Jafarabad

Population (2016)
  - Total: 319
- Time zone: UTC+3:30 (IRST)

Heydarabad (Persian: حيدراباد) (Note: Also romanized as Ḩeydarābād) is a village in Jafarabad Rural District of the Central District (Note: Formerly Jafarabad District of Qom County) in Jafarabad County, Qom province, Iran.

== Demographics ==
=== Population ===
At the time of the 2006 National Census, the village's population was 283 in 66 households, when it was in Jafarabad District (Note: Renamed the Central District of Jafarabad County) of Qom County. The following census in 2011 counted 288 people in 83 households. The 2016 census measured the population of the village as 319 people in 97 households.

In 2021, the district was separated from the county in the establishment of Jafarabad County and renamed the Central District.
