= Masumabad, Qom =

Village in Qom province, Iran

Masumabad Persian: معصوم اباد
- Village
- Location within Iran
- Coordinates: 34°50′54″N 50°40′56″E
- Country: Iran
- Province: Qom
- County: Jafarabad
- District: Central
- Rural District: Jafarabad

Population (2016)
  - Total: Below reporting threshold
- Time zone: UTC+3:30 (IRST)

Masumabad (Persian: معصوم اباد) (Note: Also romanized as Ma‘şūmābād; also known as Mūsūmābād) is a village in Jafarabad Rural District of the Central District (Note: Formerly Jafarabad District of Qom County) in Jafarabad County, Qom province, Iran.

== Demographics ==
=== Population ===
At the time of the 2006 National Census, the village's population was 27 in six households, when it was in Jafarabad District (Note: Renamed the Central District of Jafarabad County) of Qom County. The following census in 2011 counted 18 people in eight households. The 2016 census measured the population as below the reporting threshold.

In 2021, the district was separated from the county in the establishment of Jafarabad County and renamed the Central District.
