= Hoseynabad-e Zand =

Village in Qom province, Iran

Hoseynabad-e Zand Persian: حسين ابادزند
- Village
- Location within Iran
- Coordinates: 34°49′02″N 50°36′48″E
- Country: Iran
- Province: Qom
- County: Jafarabad
- District: Central
- Rural District: Jafarabad

Population (2016)
  - Total: 176
- Time zone: UTC+3:30 (IRST)

Hoseynabad-e Zand (Persian: حسين ابادزند) (Note: Also romanized as Ḩoseynābād-e Zand; also known as Ḩoseynābād) is a village in Jafarabad Rural District of the Central District (Note: Formerly Jafarabad District of Qom County) in Jafarabad County, Qom province, Iran.

== Demographics ==
=== Population ===
At the time of the 2006 National Census, the village's population was 159 in 37 households, when it was in Jafarabad District (Note: Renamed the Central District of Jafarabad County) of Qom County. The following census in 2011 counted 186 people in 50 households. The 2016 census measured the population of the village as 176 people in 51 households.

In 2021, the district was separated from the county in the establishment of Jafarabad County and renamed the Central District.
