= Seydabad, Jafarabad =

Village in Qom province, Iran

Seydabad Persian: صيداباد
- Village
- Location within Iran
- Coordinates: 34°49′11″N 50°33′33″E
- Country: Iran
- Province: Qom
- County: Jafarabad
- District: Central
- Rural District: Jafarabad

Population (2016)
  - Total: 75
- Time zone: UTC+3:30 (IRST)

Seydabad (Persian: صيداباد) (Note: Also romanized as Şeydābād) is a village in Jafarabad Rural District of the Central District (Note: Formerly Jafarabad District of Qom County) in Jafarabad County, Qom province, Iran.

== Demographics ==
=== Population ===
At the time of the 2006 National Census, the village's population was 112 in 28 households, when it was in Jafarabad District (Note: Renamed the Central District of Jafarabad County) of Qom County. The following census in 2011 counted 43 people in 12 households. The 2016 census measured the population of the village as 75 people in 23 households.

In 2021, the district was separated from the county in the establishment of Jafarabad County and renamed the Central District.
