= Nurabad, Jafarabad =

Village in Qom province, Iran

Nurabad Persian: نوراباد
- Village
- Location within Iran
- Coordinates: 34°48′49″N 50°32′23″E
- Country: Iran
- Province: Qom
- County: Jafarabad
- District: Central
- Rural District: Jafarabad

Population (2016)
  - Total: 146
- Time zone: UTC+3:30 (IRST)

Nurabad (Persian: نوراباد) (Note: Also romanized as Nūrābād) is a village in Jafarabad Rural District of the Central District (Note: Formerly Jafarabad District of Qom County) in Jafarabad County, Qom province, Iran.

== Demographics ==
=== Population ===
At the time of the 2006 National Census, the village's population was 132 in 32 households, when it was in Jafarabad District (Note: Renamed the Central District of Jafarabad County) of Qom County. The following census in 2011 counted 130 people in 33 households. The 2016 census measured the population of the village as 146 people in 42 households.

In 2021, the district was separated from the county in the establishment of Jafarabad County and renamed the Central District.
