= Qezelabad, Qom =

Village in Qom province, Iran

Qezelabad Persian: قزل اباد
- Village
- Location within Iran
- Coordinates: 34°47′24″N 50°33′51″E
- Country: Iran
- Province: Qom
- County: Jafarabad
- District: Central
- Rural District: Jafarabad

Population (2016)
  - Total: 77
- Time zone: UTC+3:30 (IRST)

Qezelabad (Persian: قزل اباد) (Note: Also romanized as Qezelābād) is a village in Jafarabad Rural District of the Central District (Note: Formerly Jafarabad District of Qom County) in Jafarabad County, Qom province, Iran.

== Demographics ==
=== Population ===
At the time of the 2006 National Census, the village's population was 111 in 22 households, when it was in Jafarabad District (Note: Renamed the Central District of Jafarabad County) of Qom County. The following census in 2011 counted 76 people in 14 households. The 2016 census measured the population of the village as 77 people in 22 households.

In 2021, the district was separated from the county in the establishment of Jafarabad County and renamed the Central District.
