= Bostanabad, Qom =

Village in Qom province, Iran

Bostanabad Persian: بستان اباد
- Village
- Country: Iran
- Province: Qom
- County: Jafarabad
- District: Central
- Rural District: Jafarabad

Population (2016)
  - Total: 326
- Time zone: UTC+3:30 (IRST)

Bostanabad (Persian: بستان اباد) (Note: Also romanized as Bostānābād; formerly known as Shāh Bostān (شاه بستان)) is a village in Jafarabad Rural District of the Central District (Note: Formerly Jafarabad District of Qom County) in Jafarabad County, Qom province, Iran.

== Demographics ==
=== Population ===
At the time of the 2006 National Census, the village's population was 336 in 78 households, when it was in Jafarabad District (Note: Renamed the Central District of Jafarabad County) of Qom County. The following census in 2011 counted 344 people in 91 households. The 2016 census measured the population of the village as 326 people in 99 households.

In 2021, the district was separated from the county in the establishment of Jafarabad County and renamed the Central District.
