= Sharifabad-e Gavkhuni =

Village in Qom province, Iran

Sharifabad-e Gavkhuni Persian: شريف ابادگاوخوني
- Village
- Location within Iran
- Coordinates: 34°51′19″N 50°38′33″E
- Country: Iran
- Province: Qom
- County: Jafarabad
- District: Central
- Rural District: Jafarabad

Population (2016)
  - Total: 66
- Time zone: UTC+3:30 (IRST)

Sharifabad-e Gavkhuni (Persian: شريف ابادگاوخوني) (Note: Also romanized as Sharīfābād-e Gāvkhūnī; also known as Sharīfābād) is a village in Jafarabad Rural District of the Central District (Note: Formerly Jafarabad District of Qom County) in Jafarabad County, Qom province, Iran.

== Demographics ==
=== Population ===
At the time of the 2006 National Census, the village's population was 56 in 13 households, when it was in Jafarabad District (Note: Renamed the Central District of Jafarabad County) of Qom County. The following census in 2011 counted 65 people in 20 households. The 2016 census measured the population of the village as 66 people in 23 households.

In 2021, the district was separated from the county in the establishment of Jafarabad County and renamed the Central District.
