= Najmabad, Jafarabad =

Village in Qom province, Iran

Najmabad Persian: نجم اباد
- Village
- Location within Iran
- Coordinates: 34°48′13″N 50°34′19″E
- Country: Iran
- Province: Qom
- County: Jafarabad
- District: Central
- Rural District: Jafarabad

Population (2016)
  - Total: 110
- Time zone: UTC+3:30 (IRST)

Najmabad (Persian: نجم اباد) (Note: Also romanized as Najmābād) is a village in Jafarabad Rural District of the Central District (Note: Formerly Jafarabad District of Qom County) in Jafarabad County, Qom province, Iran.

== Demographics ==
=== Population ===
At the time of the 2006 National Census, the village's population was 70 in 15 households, when it was in Jafarabad District (Note: Renamed the Central District of Jafarabad County) of Qom County. The following census in 2011 counted 87 people in 23 households. The 2016 census measured the population of the village as 110 people in 35 households.

In 2021, the district was separated from the county in the establishment of Jafarabad County and renamed the Central District.
