= Jafarabad Rural District =

Rural district in Qom province, Iran

Jafarabad Rural District Persian: دهستان جعفرآباد
- Rural District
- Location within Iran
- Coordinates: 34°49′N 50°38′E
- Country: Iran
- Province: Qom
- County: Jafarabad
- District: Central
- Established: 1987
- Capital: Jafarabad

Population (2016)
  - Total: 9,676
- Time zone: UTC+3:30 (IRST)

Jafarabad Rural District (Persian: دهستان جعفرآباد) is in the Central District (Note: Formerly Jafarabad District of Qom County) of Jafarabad County, Qom province, Iran. Its capital is the village of Jafarabad. The previous capital of the rural district was the village of Gazeran, now the city of Jafariyeh.

== Demographics ==
=== Population ===
At the time of the 2006 National Census, the rural district's population (as a part of Jafarabad District (Note: Renamed the Central District of Jafarabad County) in Qom County) was 8,699 in 1,995 households. There were 9,716 inhabitants in 2,594 households at the following census of 2011. The 2016 census measured the population of the rural district as 9,676 in 2,760 households. The most populous of its 55 villages was Baqerabad (now in Baqerabad Rural District), with 1,739 people.

In 2021, the district was separated from the county in the establishment of Jafarabad County and renamed the Central District.

=== Other villages in the rural district ===
- Abdolabad-e Pain
- Alvirabad
- Bostanabad
- Dowlatabad
- Heydarabad
- Hoseynabad-e Zand
- Karimabad
- Khedarabad
- Mahmudabad
- Masumabad
- Moqbelabad
- Najmabad
- Nurabad
- Pachian
- Pestagan
- Qezelabad
- Sadabad
- Safdar
- Seydabad
- Sharifabad-e Gavkhuni
