= Jafariyeh =

City in Qom province, Iran

Jafariyeh Persian: جعفريه
- City
- Location within Iran
- Coordinates: 34°46′25″N 50°30′59″E
- Country: Iran
- Province: Qom
- County: Jafarabad
- District: Central

Population (2016)
  - Total: 9,387
- Time zone: UTC+3:30 (IRST)

Jafariyeh (Persian: جعفريه) (Note: Also romanized as Ja‘farīyeh; also known as Jafarie; formerly Jafarabad (جعفر آباد), also romanized as Ja‘farābād; formerly the village of Gazeran (گازران)) is a city in the Central District (Note: Formerly Jafarabad District of Qom County) of Jafarabad County, Qom province, Iran, serving as capital of both the county and the district. As the village of Gazeran, it was the capital of Jafarabad Rural District until its capital was transferred to the village of Jafarabad.

== Demographics ==
=== Population ===
At the time of the 2006 National Census, the village's population was 6,635 in 1,516 households, when it was capital of Jafarabad District (Note: Renamed the Central District of Jafarabad County) in Qom County. The following census in 2011 counted 7,203 people in 1,804 households. The 2016 census measured the population of the village as 9,387 people in 2,552 households.

In 2021, the district was separated from the county in the establishment of Jafarabad County and renamed the Central District, with Jafariyeh as the new county's capital.
