= Central District (Jafarabad County) =

District in Qom province, Iran

Central District (Jafarabad County) Persian: بخش مرکزی شهرستان جعفرآباد
- District
- Location within Iran
- Coordinates: 34°45′N 50°36′E
- Country: Iran
- Province: Qom
- County: Jafarabad
- Capital: Jafariyeh

Population (2016)
  - Total: 19,063 (Note: As Jafarabad District of Qom County)
- Time zone: UTC+3:30 (IRST)

The Central District of Jafarabad County (Note: Formerly Jafarabad District (بخش جعفرآباد) of Qom County) (Persian: بخش مرکزی شهرستان جعفرآباد) is in Qom province, Iran. Its capital is the city of Jafariyeh. (Note: Formerly the village of Gazeran)

== History ==
In 2021, Jafarabad District (Note: Renamed the Central District of Jafarabad County) and Qahan Rural District were separated from Qom County in the establishment of Jafarabad County, which was divided into two districts of two rural districts each, with Jafariyeh as its capital and only city at the time.

== Demographics ==
=== Population ===
At the time of the 2006 National Census, the district's population was 15,334, in 3,511 households. The following census in 2011 counted 16,919 people in 4,398 households. The 2016 census measured the population of the district as 19,063 in 5,312 households.

=== Administrative divisions ===
Central District (Jafarabad County) (Note: As Jafarabad District of Qom County at the 2006, 2011, and 2016 censuses)
| Administrative Divisions | 2006 | 2011 | 2016 |
|---|---|---|---|
| Baqerabad RD (Note: Established after the 2016 census) | | | |
| Jafarabad RD | 8,699 | 9,716 | 9,676 |
| Jafariyeh (city) | 6,635 | 7,203 | 9,387 |
| Total | 15,334 | 16,919 | 19,063 |
RD = Rural District
