= Jafarabad County =

County in Qom province, Iran

Jafarabad County Persian: شهرستان جعفرآباد
- County
- Location of Jafarabad County in Qom province (green)

- Location of Qom province in Iran
- Coordinates: 34°45′N 50°27′E
- Country: Iran
- Province: Qom
- Established: 2021
- Capital: Jafariyeh
- Districts: Central, Qahan
- Time zone: UTC+3:30 (IRST)

Jafarabad County (Persian: شهرستان جعفرآباد) is in Qom province, Iran. Its capital is the city of Jafariyeh, (Note: Formerly the village of Gazeran) whose population at the time of the 2016 National Census was 9,387 in 2,552 households.

== History ==
In 2021, Jafarabad District (Note: Renamed the Central District of Jafarabad County) and Qahan Rural District were separated from Qom County in the establishment of Jafarabad County, which was divided into two districts of two rural districts each, with Jafariyeh as its capital and only city at the time. The village of Qahan was converted to a city in 2017.

== Demographics ==
=== Administrative divisions ===
Jafarabad County's administrative structure is shown in the following table.

Jafarabad County
Administrative Divisions
Central District (Note: Formerly Jafarabad District of Qom County)
Baqerabad RD
Jafarabad RD
Jafariyeh (city)
Qahan District
Kohandan RD
Qahan RD
Qahan (city) (Note: Became a city after the 2016 census)
RD = Rural District

== See also ==
Media related to Jafarabad County at Wikimedia Commons
