= Qom province =

Province of Iran

Qom province استان قم (Persian)
- Province
- Coordinates: 34°40′N 50°50′E
- Country: Iran
- Region: Region 1
- Established: 1996
- Capital: Qom
- Counties: 3

Government
  - Governor-general: Akbar Behnamjoo (Independent)

Area
  - Total: 11,526 km^{2} (4,450 sq mi)

Population (2016)
  - Total: 1,292,283
  - Density: 112.12/km^{2} (290.39/sq mi)
- Time zone: UTC+03:30 (IRST)
- ISO 3166 code: IR-25
- Main language(s): Persian
- HDI (2017): 0.816 very high · 7th

Qom Province (Persian: استان قم) (Note: Also romanized as Ostān-e Qom; pre-Islamic Komishan or Qomishan) is one of the 31 provinces of Iran with 11,237 km², covering 0.89% of the total area of the country. Its capital is the city of Qom.

The province is in the central part of the country and was formed from part of Tehran province in 1996. The province was designated as part of Region 1 following the division of Iranian provinces into 5 regions which took place on June 22, 2014, for the purposes of coordination and development. As of 2016, the province had a population of 1,292,283.

== History ==
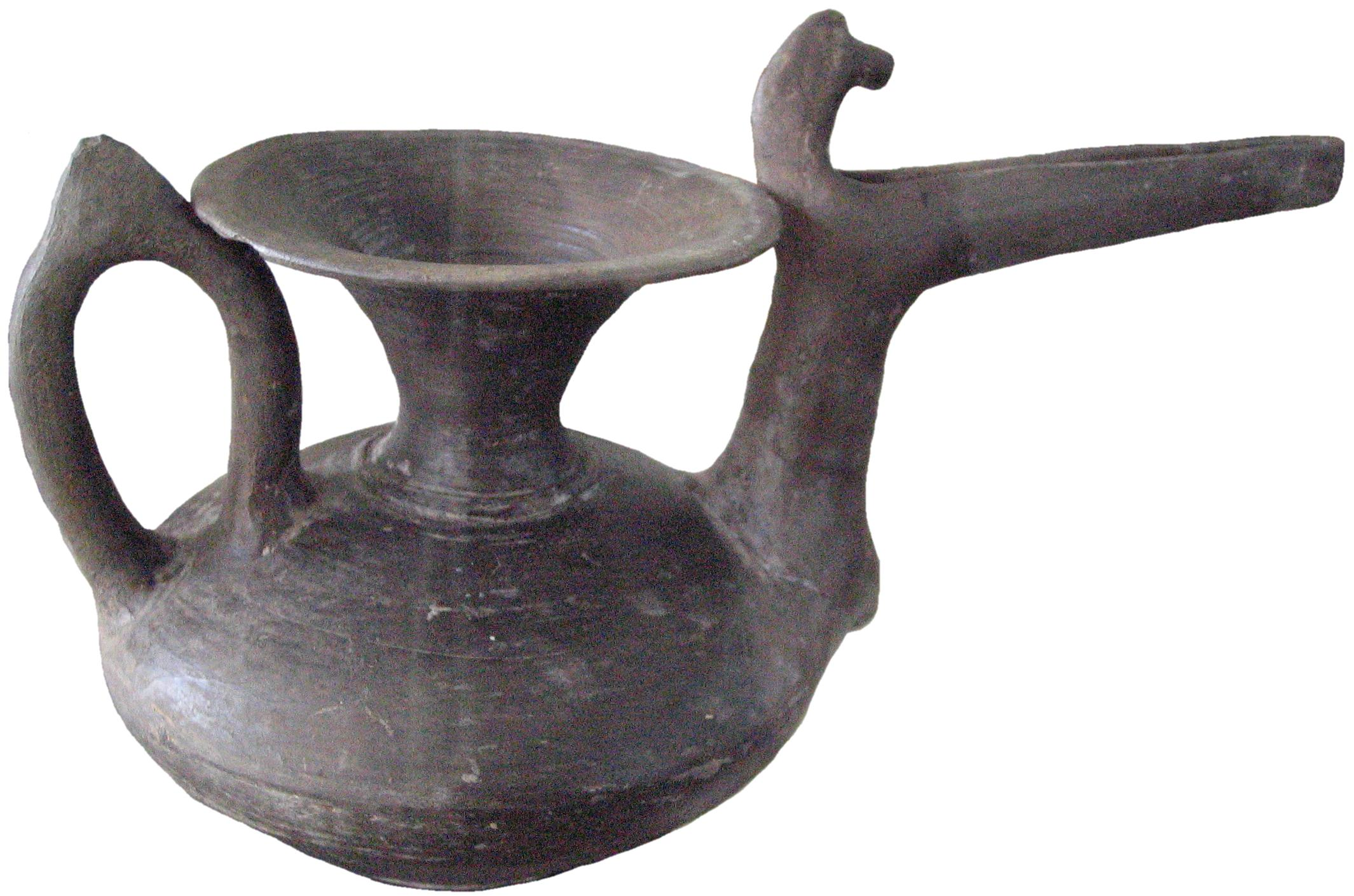
Vessel from Kahak, Qom, dated mid-first millennium BC.

Qom is thought to have existed in pre-Islamic ages. Archeological discoveries indicate Qom as a residential area from the 5th millennium BCE. According to the pre-Islamic remaining relics and historical texts, Qom was a large city. 'Kom' was the name of the ancient rampart of the city of Qom, thus, the Arabs called it Qom during the Arab conquests of Iran.

It was during the reign of the second caliph Umar, that the Muslims captured Qom's center. In 644–645 CE, Abu Moosa Ashari, dispatched forces under his command to Qom. Conflicts arose between the invading Arabs and the residents of the area.

During the persecution of the Alavids by the Abbasids and Umayyads, many Alavids fled to Qom, making it their permanent home. The Caliph Al-Ma'mun sent forces to Qom in the year 825 CE, resulting in a public massacre and destruction of the city.

On hearing of the demise of al-Ma'mun, the inhabitants of Qom revolted and were successful in overthrowing the representative of the Caliph in 831 CE. However, al-Ma'mun's successor, al-Mu'tasim, dispatched forces to Qom in order to curb the riots and once again the city was set aflame. The unrest continued until the Buyid dynasty came to power, being of the Alavid community. It was during this time that the city of Qom expanded and thrived.

In the Seljuk era, the city flourished once more. During the first wave of the Mongol invasion, the city witnessed destruction, but after Mongol rulers, particularly after Sultan Öljeitü Khoda bandeh of the Ilkhanate converted to Islam, the city received special attention, thus witnessing a revival once again.

In the late 14th century, the city came under the plunder of Tamerlane when the inhabitants were massacred. During the periods of the rule of the Qarah Qoyoonloo, Aq Qoyoonloo, and especially during the Safavid era, Qom gained special attention and gradually developed.

By 1503, Qom became one of the important centers of theology in relation to the Shia Islam and became a vital pilgrimage site and religious pivot.

During the Afghan invasion, the city of Qom suffered heavy damages, and its inhabitants witnessed severe economic hardships. Qom sustained further damages during the reign of Nader Shah, as well as the conflicts between the Zand and Qajar dynasties for control over Iran.

In 1798, Qom came under the control of Agha Mohammad Khan Qajar. On being victorious over his enemies, Fath-Ali Shah Qajar made repairs to the sepulcher and shrine of Ma'soumeh, fulfilling his vow.

The city of Qom thrived in the Qajar era. After Russian forces entered Karaj in 1915, many of the inhabitants of Tehran moved to Qom. The transfer of the capital from Tehran to Qom was discussed, but the British and Russians demolished the plan by bringing the monarch of the times, Ahmad Shah Qajar under pressure. Coinciding with this period, a 'National Defense Committee' was set up, and Qom turned into a political and military apex against the Russian and British colonial powers. Qom was also the center from which Ayatollah Khomeini based his opposition to the Pahlavi dynasty, while in Iran.

== Demographics ==
=== Population ===
At the time of the 2006 National Census, the province's population was 1,036,714, in 262,313 households. The following census in 2011 counted 1,151,672 people in 320,977 households, of whom 95.2% resided in urban areas of the province. The 2016 census measured the population of the province as 1,292,283 in 383,532 households.

=== Administrative divisions ===

The population history and structural changes of Qom province's administrative divisions over three consecutive censuses are shown in the following table.

Qom Province
Counties	2006	2011	2016
Jafarabad County (Note: Separated from Qom County after the 2016 census)	—	—	—
Kahak County	—	—	—
Qom County	1,036,714	1,151,672	1,292,283
Total	1,036,714	1,151,672	1,292,283

=== Cities ===
According to the 2016 census, 1,229,964 people (over 95% of the population of Qom province) live in the following cities:

City	Population
Dastjerd	1,525
Jafariyeh	9,387
Kahak	4,837
Qanavat	11,667
Qom	1,201,158
Salafchegan	1,390

== Geography ==
The climate of Qom Province varies between a desert and semi-desert climate and comprises mountainous areas, foothills, and plains. Due to being located near an arid region and far inland, it experiences a dry climate, with low humidity and scanty rainfall. Thus, agriculture is not possible in most of its areas, especially near the salt lake regions. Qom province has two large salt lakes, namely: Howz e Soltan Lake, which lies 36 km due north of Qom, and Namak Lake which lies 80 km due east of Qom. Nearly a fifth of Namak Lake lies within Qom Province.

=== City of Qom ===
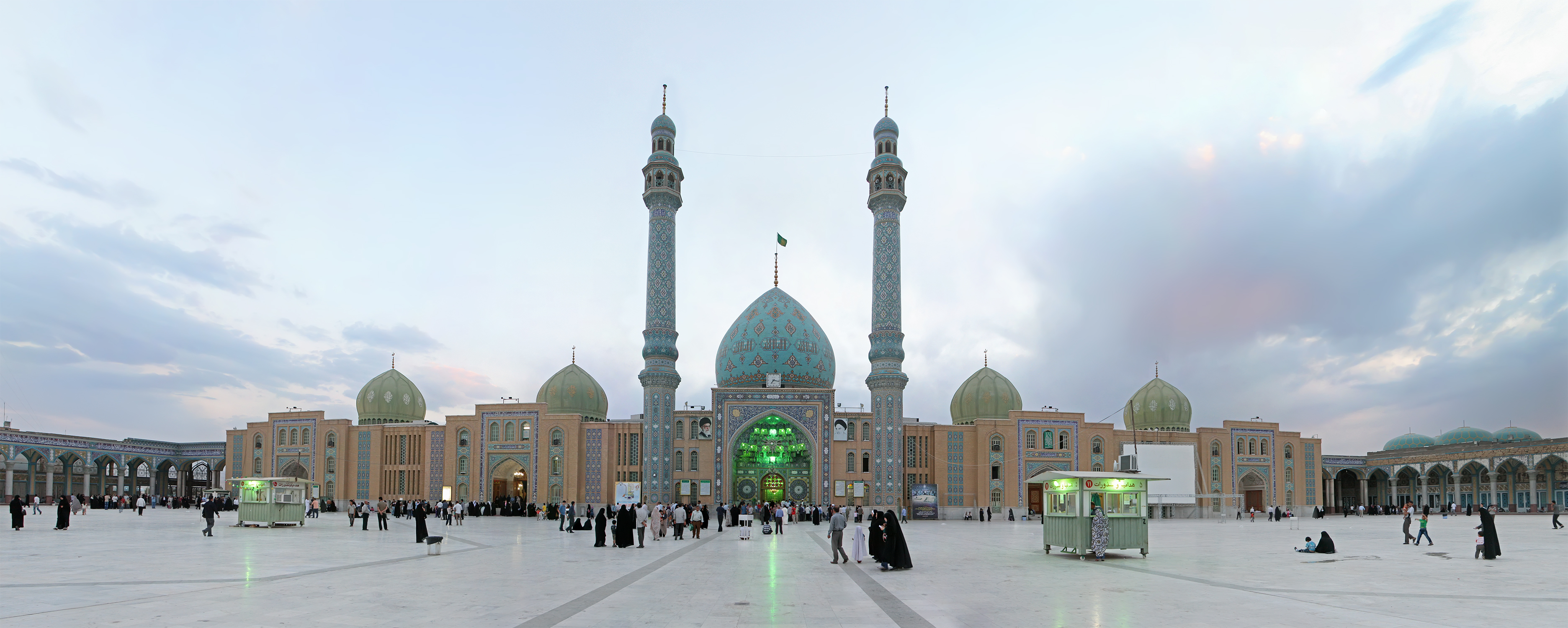
The Jamkaran mosque is a popular pilgrimage site for Shia Muslims

Today, Qom is considered one of the focal centers of the Shiah branch of Islam. Its theological center and the shrine of Ma'soomeh are prominent features of the provincial capital of Qom. Outside the city is Jamkaran, another site of religious pilgrimages.

Qom has at times again been considered as a possible candidate for moving the political capital of Iran, as Tehran faces an increasing probability of an overdue major earthquake and is notorious for its pollution and traffic congestion. The conservative factions are favorable to this idea while the business and economic base of Tehran opposes any such moves.

In 2009, it was disclosed that a mountain range near Qom is the site of Iran's second uranium enrichment facility, containing 3000 gas centrifuges.

== Politics ==
Qom Province is a politically conservative region.

== Culture ==
Iran's Cultural Heritage Organization lists 195 sites of historical and cultural significance in Qom. The most visited sites are:

- Fatima Masumeh Shrine
- Kahak cave
- Vashnuh cave
- Howz e Soltan Salt Lake
- Namak Great Salt Lake
- Mar'ashi Najafi Library, with over 500,000 handwritten texts and copies.
- Astaneh Moqaddaseh Museum
- Qom Bazaar
- Feyzieh Seminary
- Jamkaran Mosque
- Qom Jame' Mosque
- Qom Atiq Mosque
- A'zam Mosque

== Colleges and universities ==
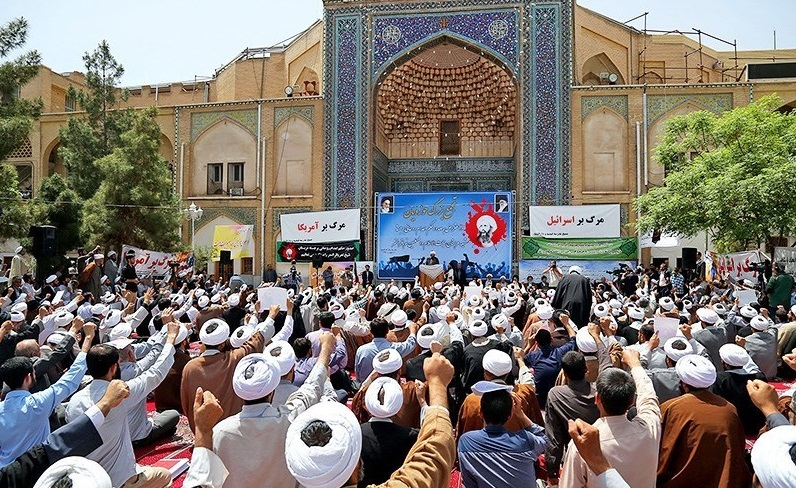
Qom Seminary

- College of Farabi, University of Tehran
- University of Qom
- Mofid University
- Islamic Azad University of Qom
- The Research Institute of Hawzeh va Daneshgah
- Computer Research Center of Islamic Sciences
- Imam Khomeini Education and Research Institute
- Qom University of Medical Sciences, (website)
- Qom's Feyzieh Seminary (called The Hawzah)
- Payam Noor University of Qom

== Gallery ==
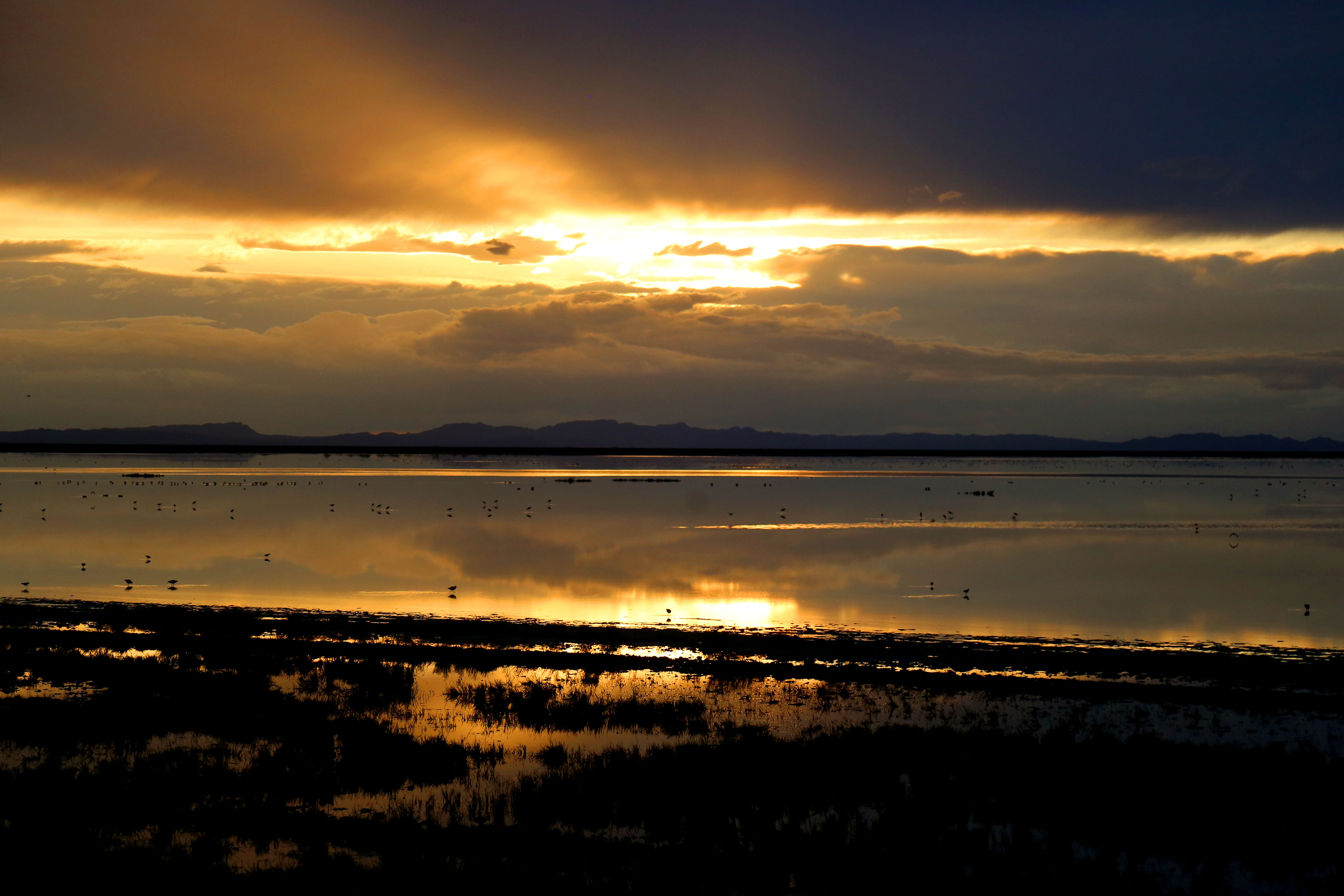
Hoz Marreh Wetland

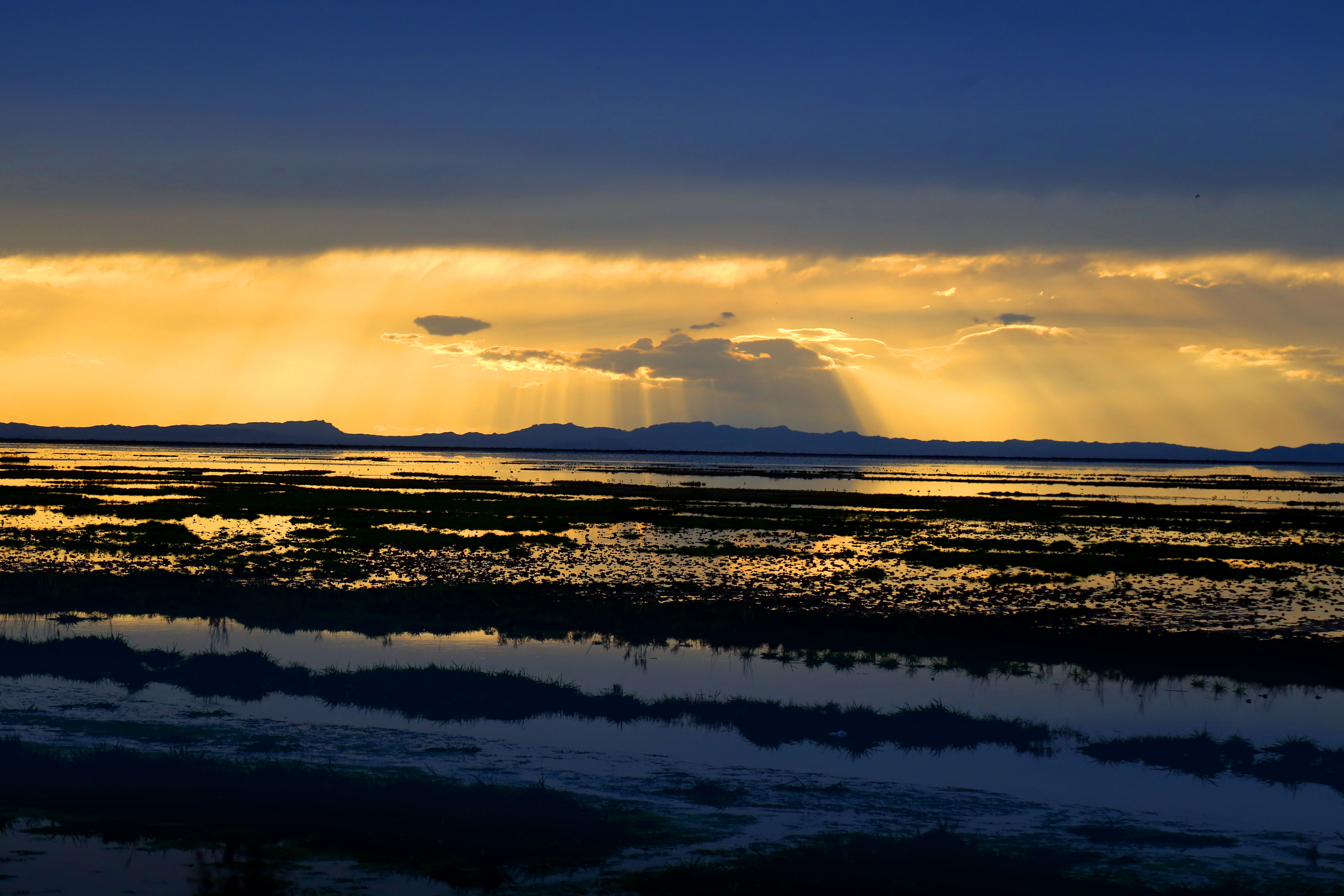
Hoz Marreh Wetland

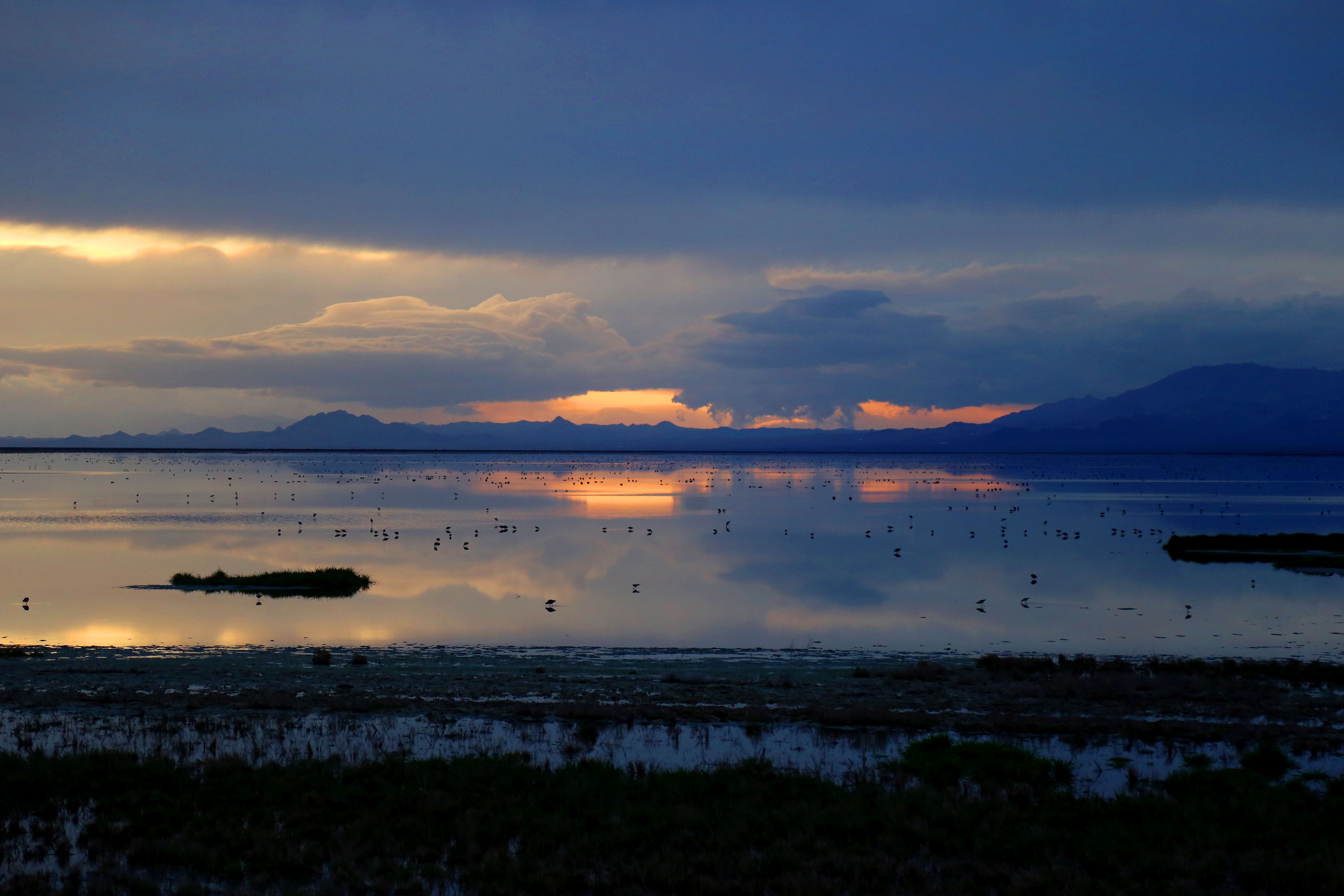
Hoz Marreh Wetland

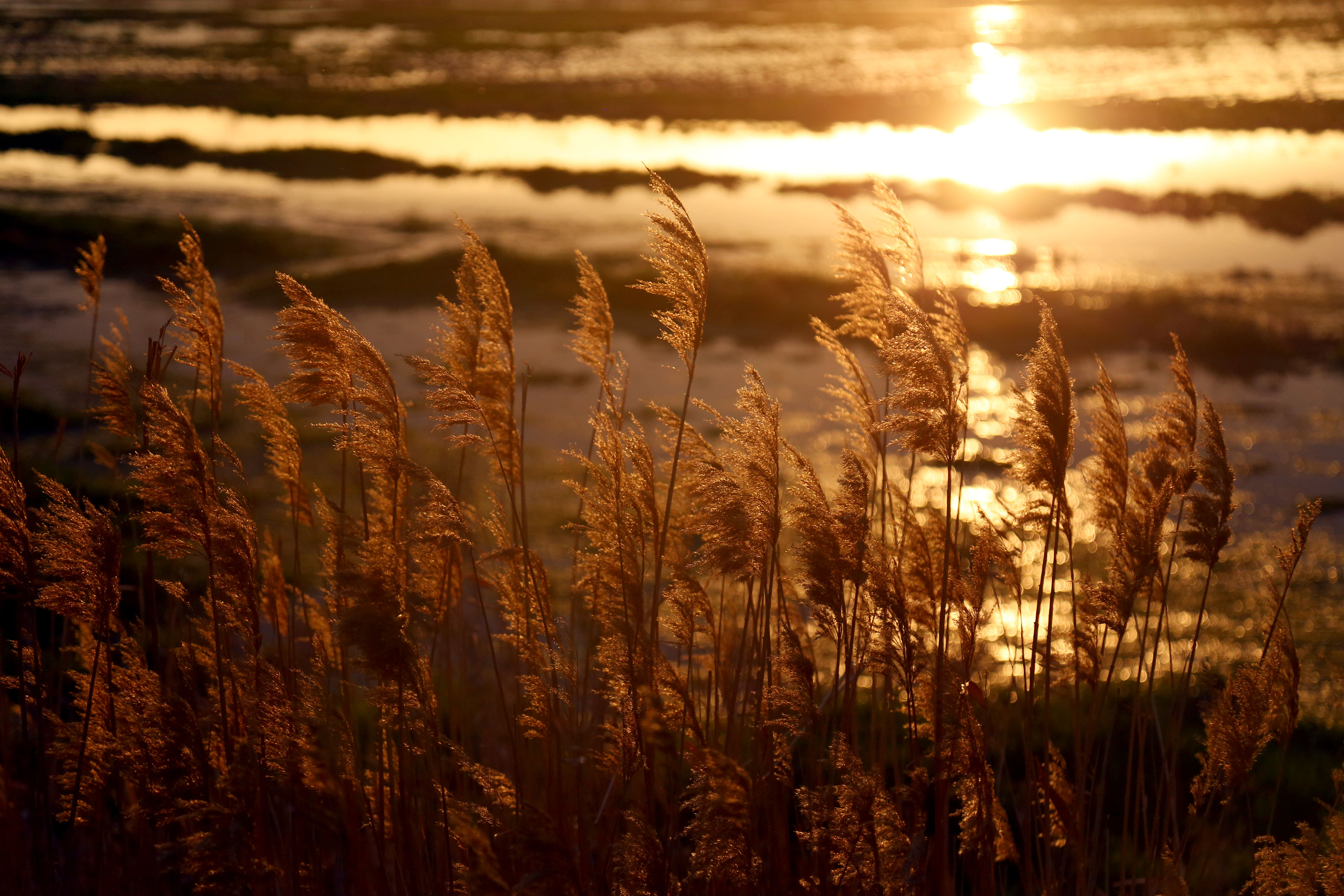
Hoz Marreh Wetland

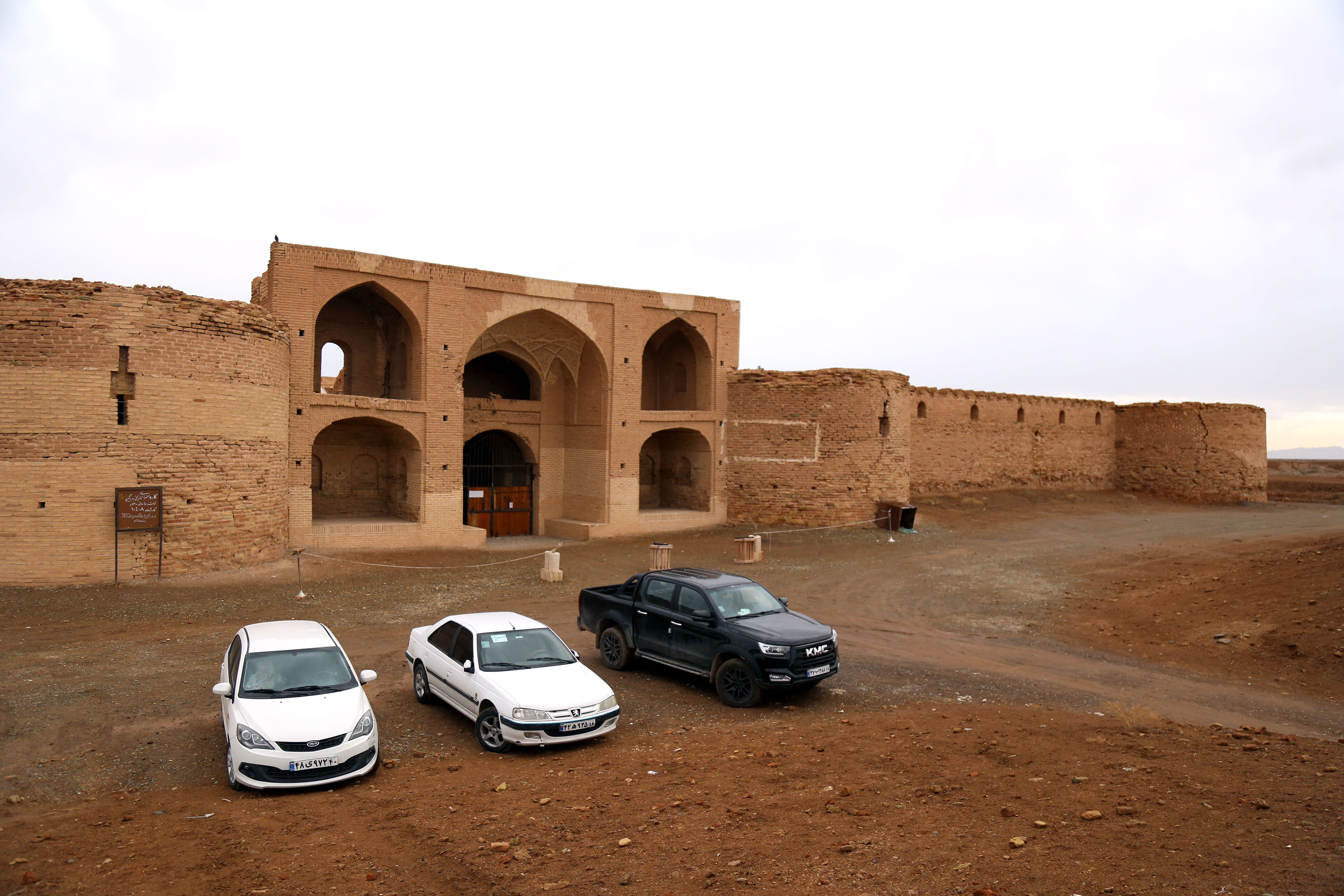
Deyr-e Gachin Caravanserai

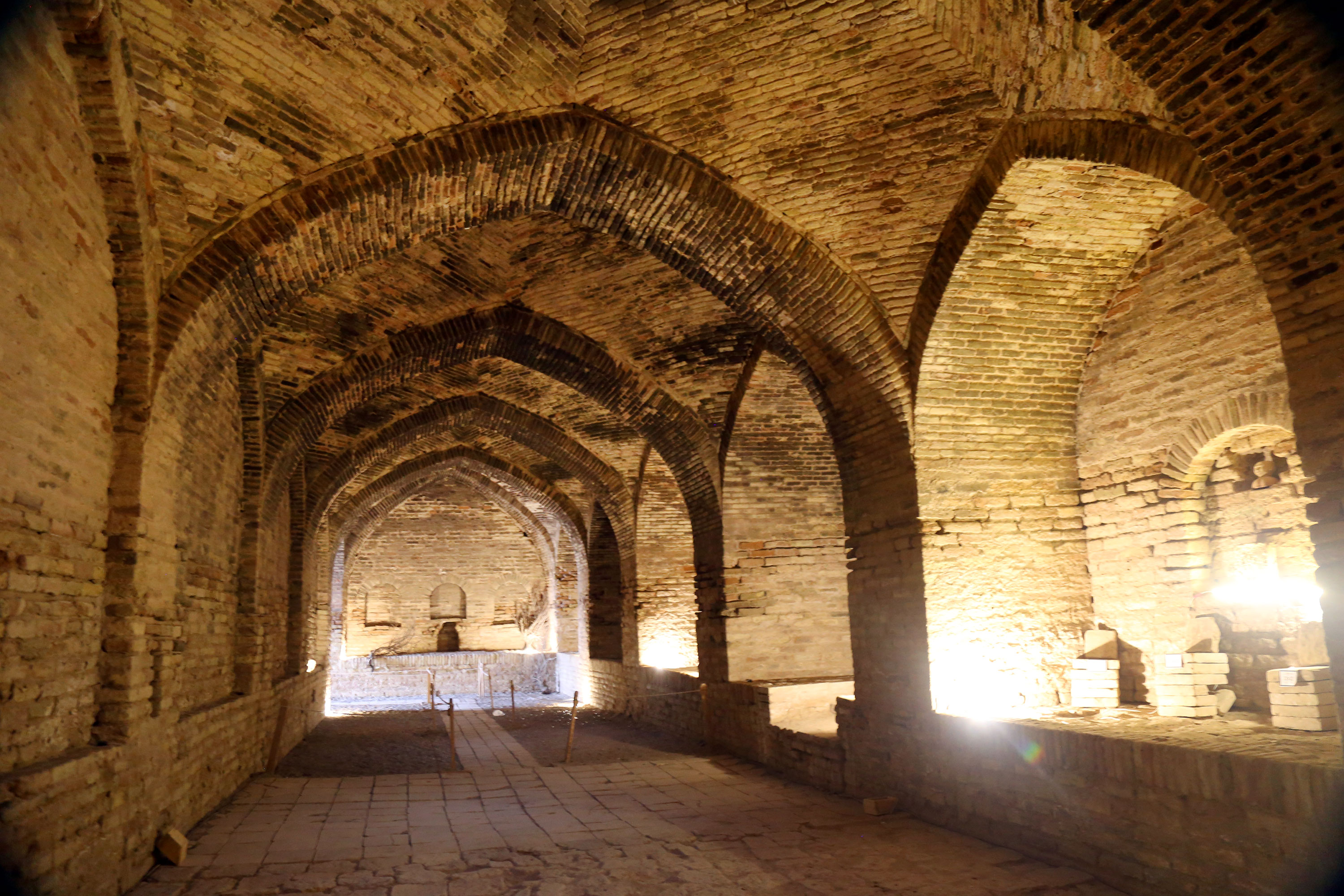
Deyr-e Gachin Caravanserai

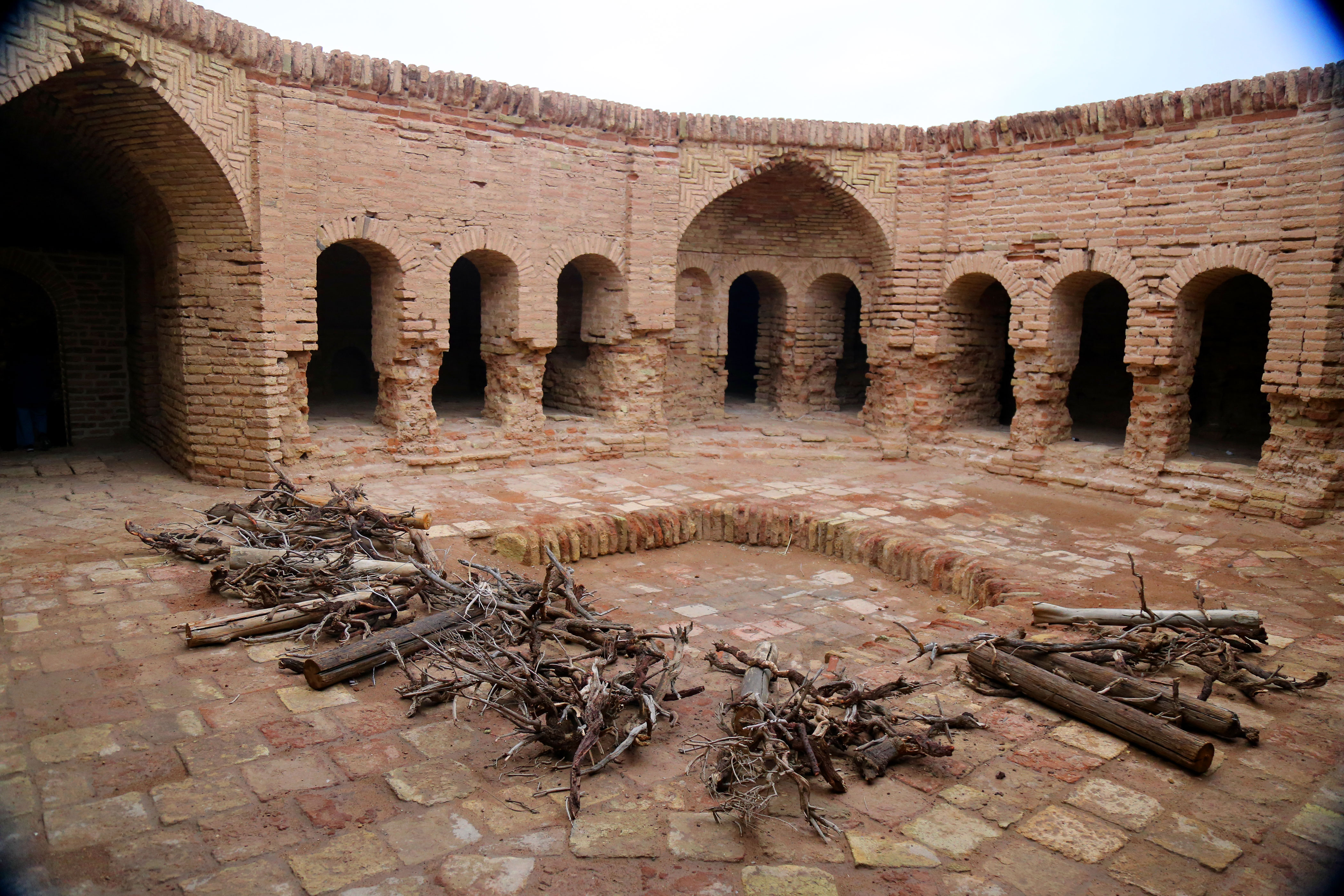
Deyr-e Gachin Caravanserai

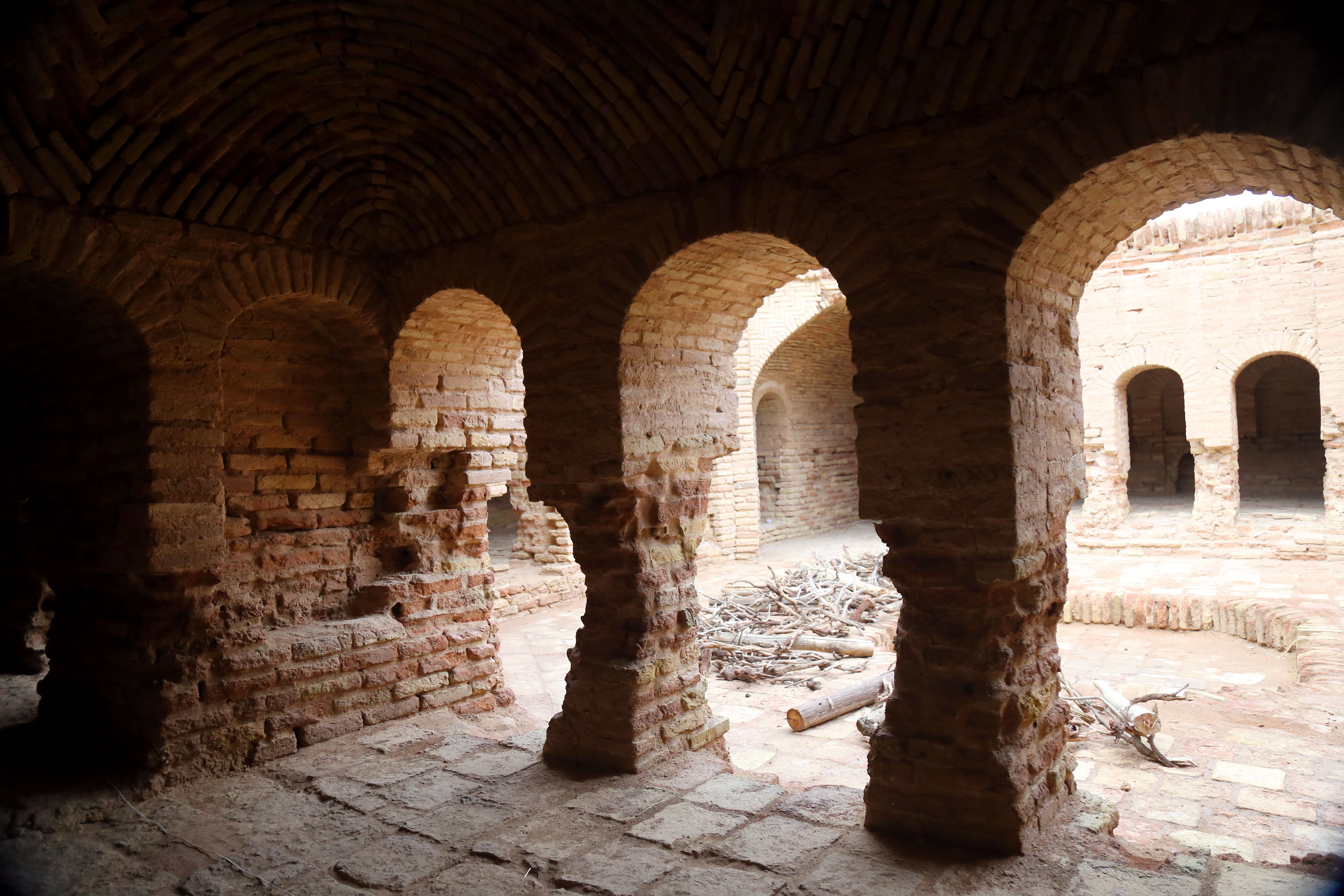
Deyr-e Gachin Caravanserai

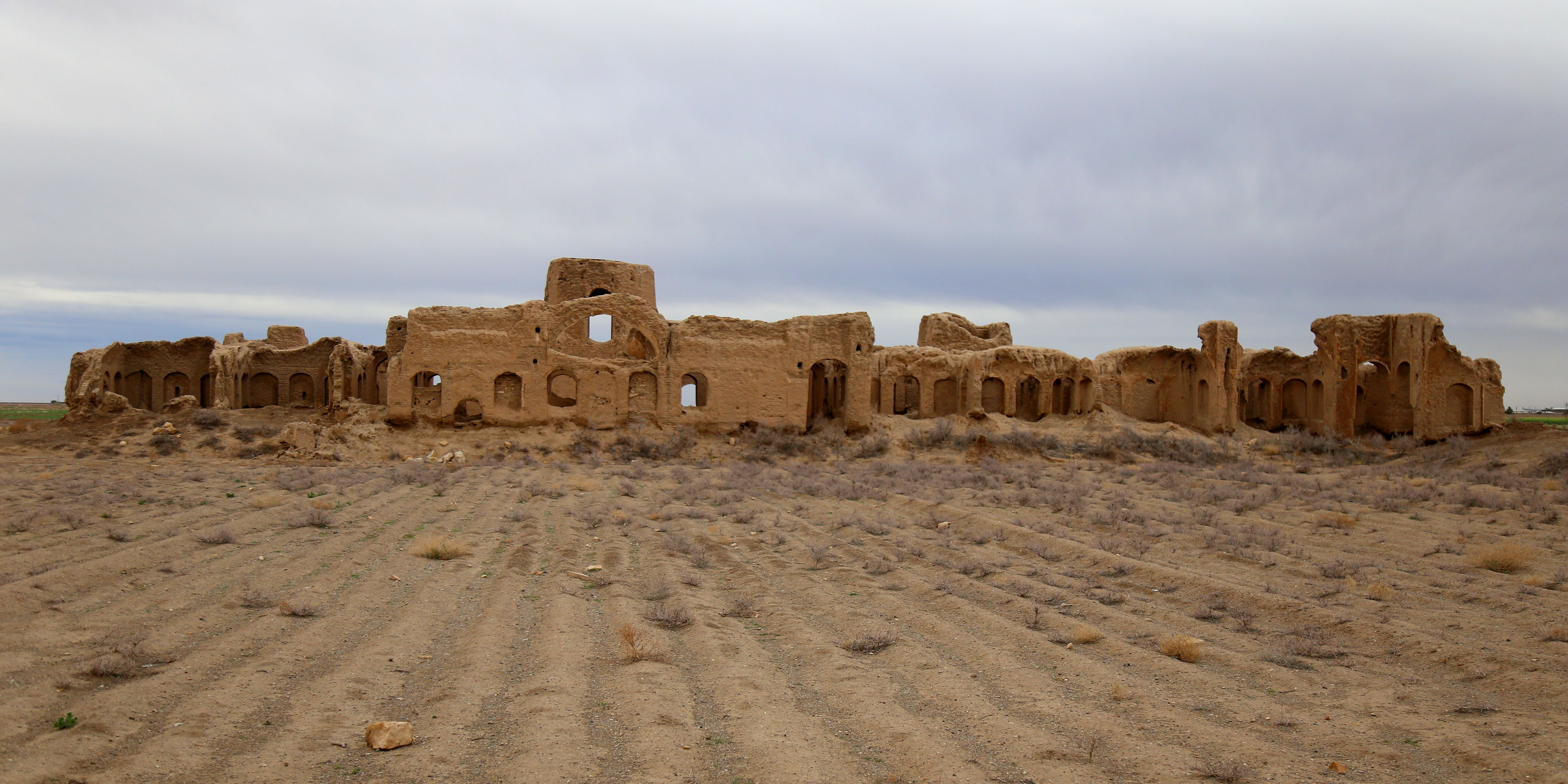
Qomrud Castle

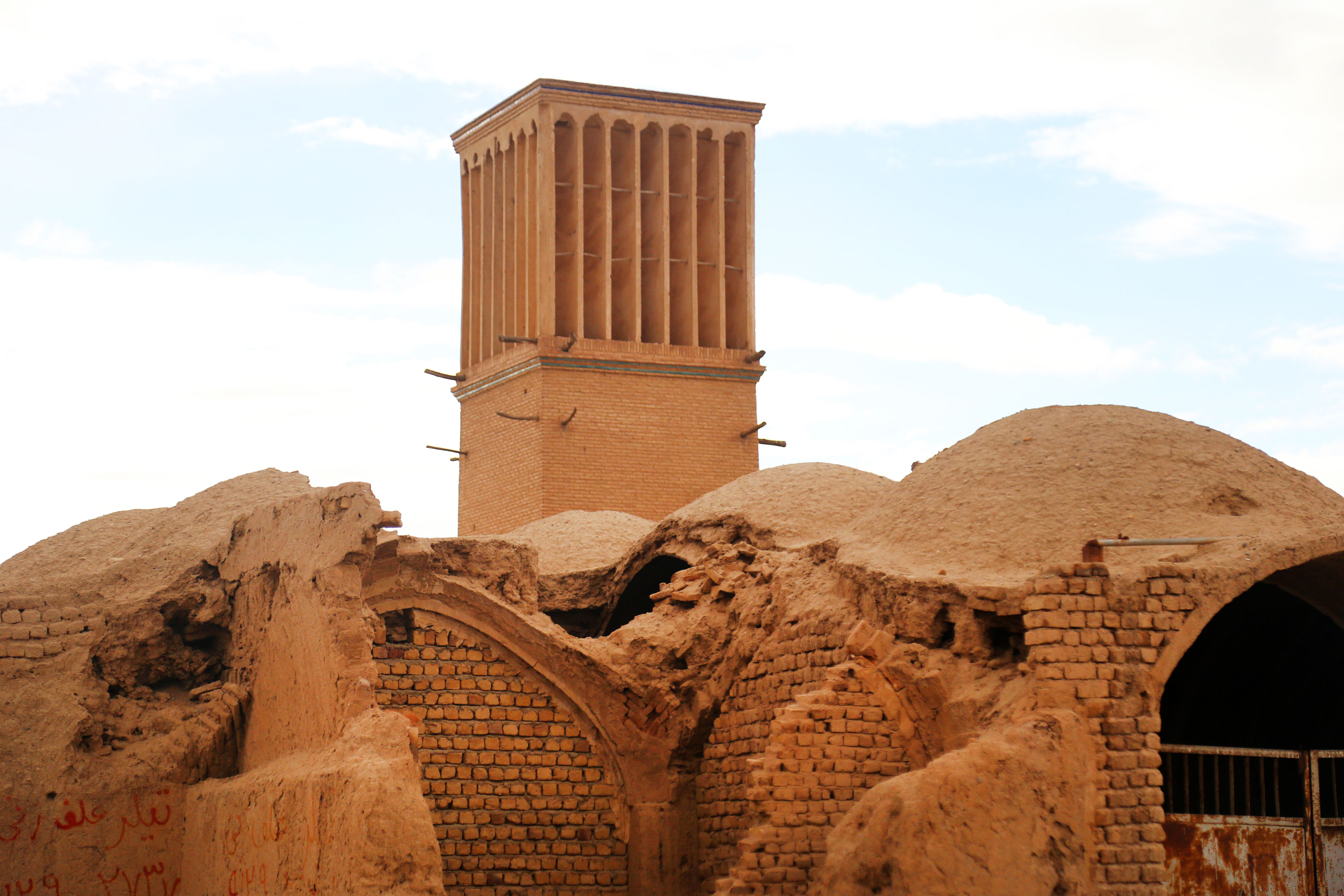
Qomrud Windcatcher

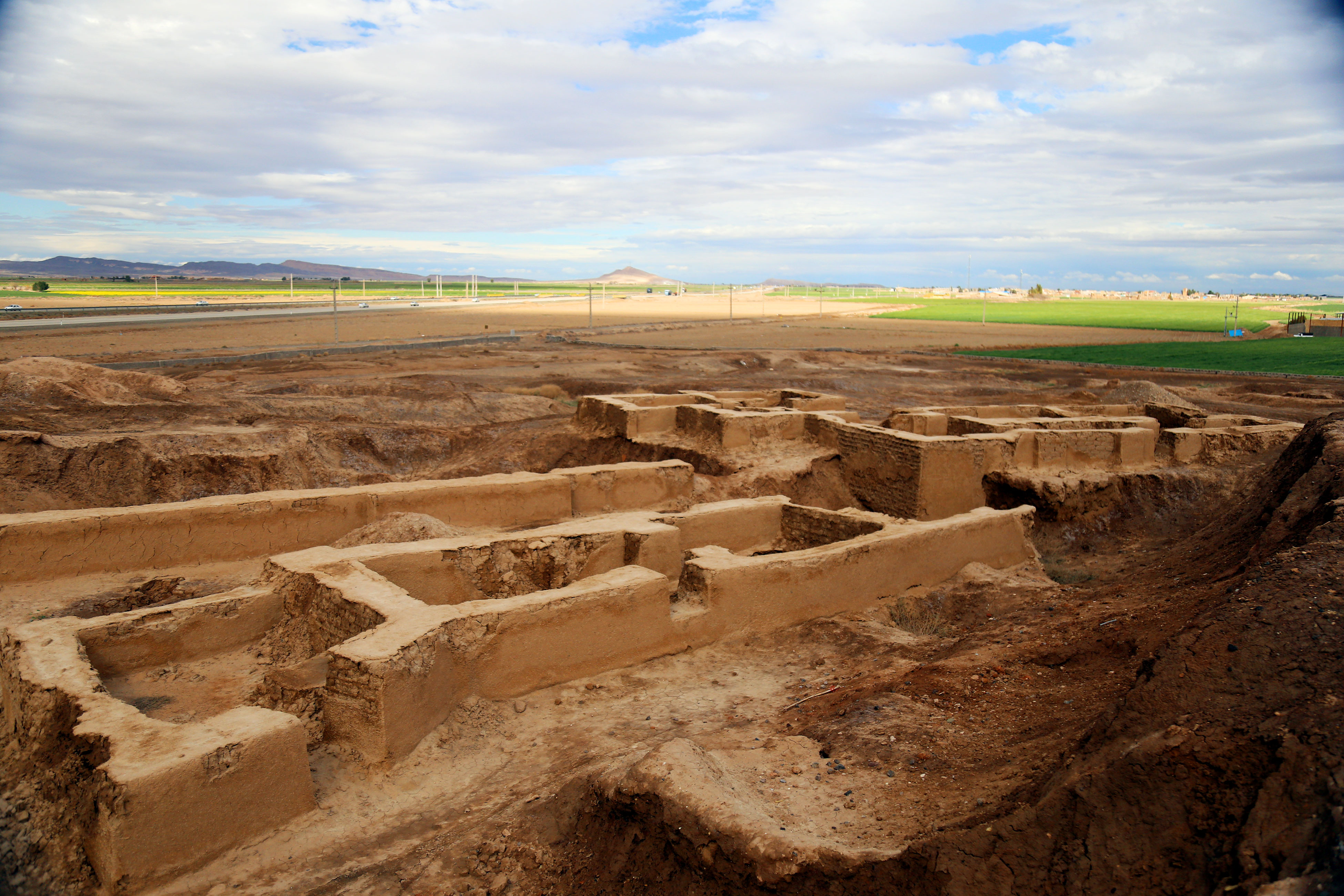
QaraTappeh Archaeological site

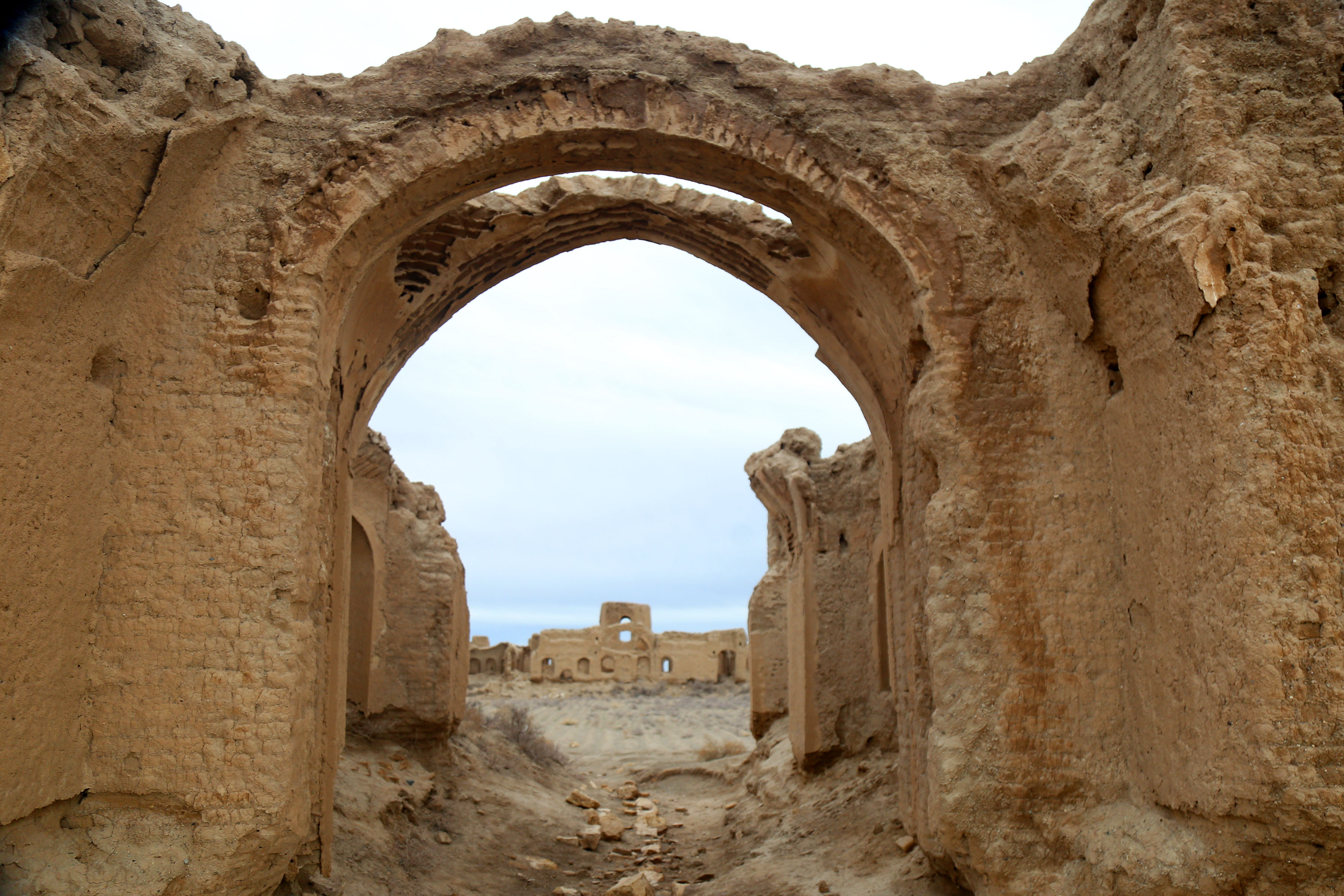
Qomrud Castle

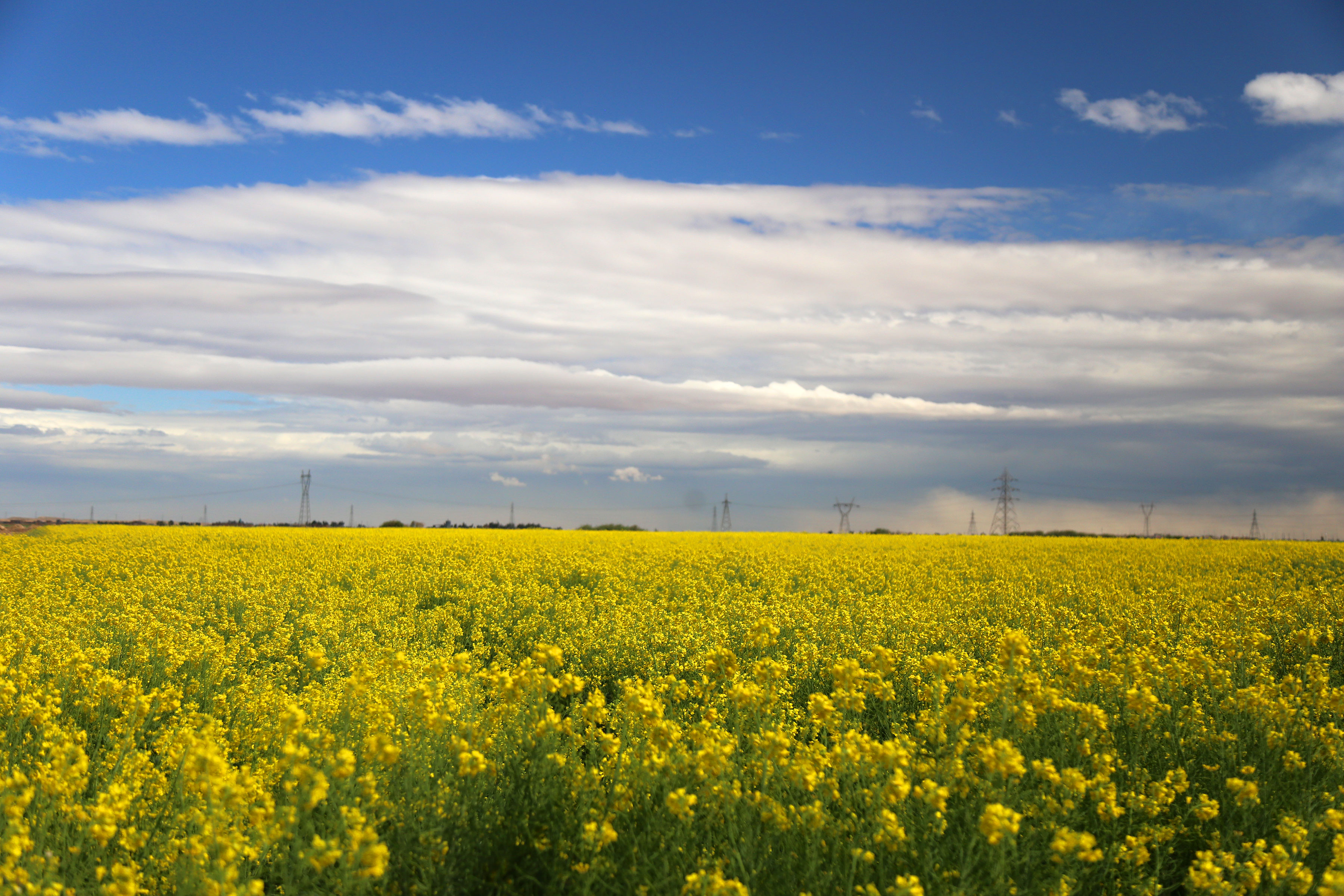
Qom-Garmsar Road

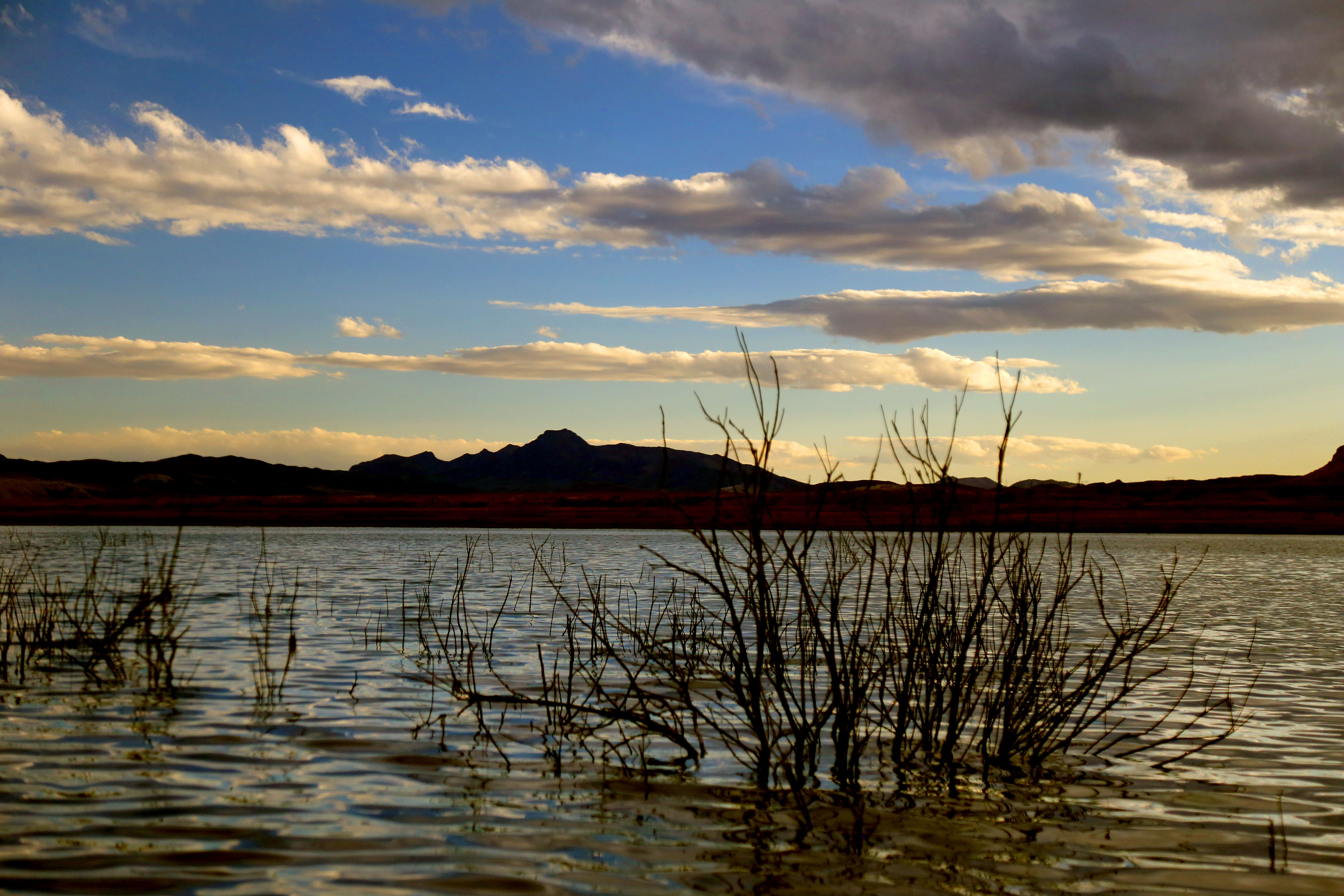
15 Khordad Dam

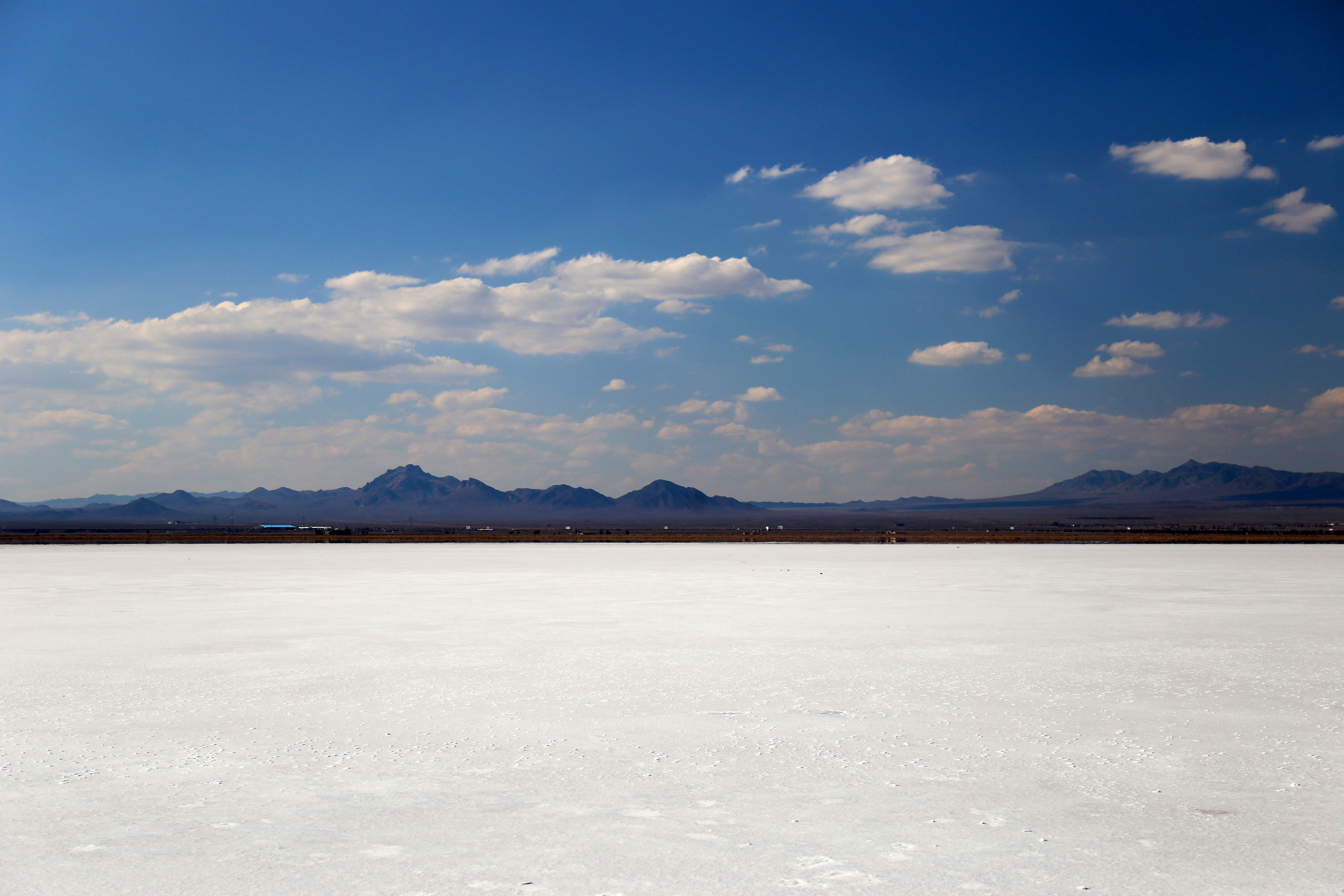
Hoz Soltan Salt Lake

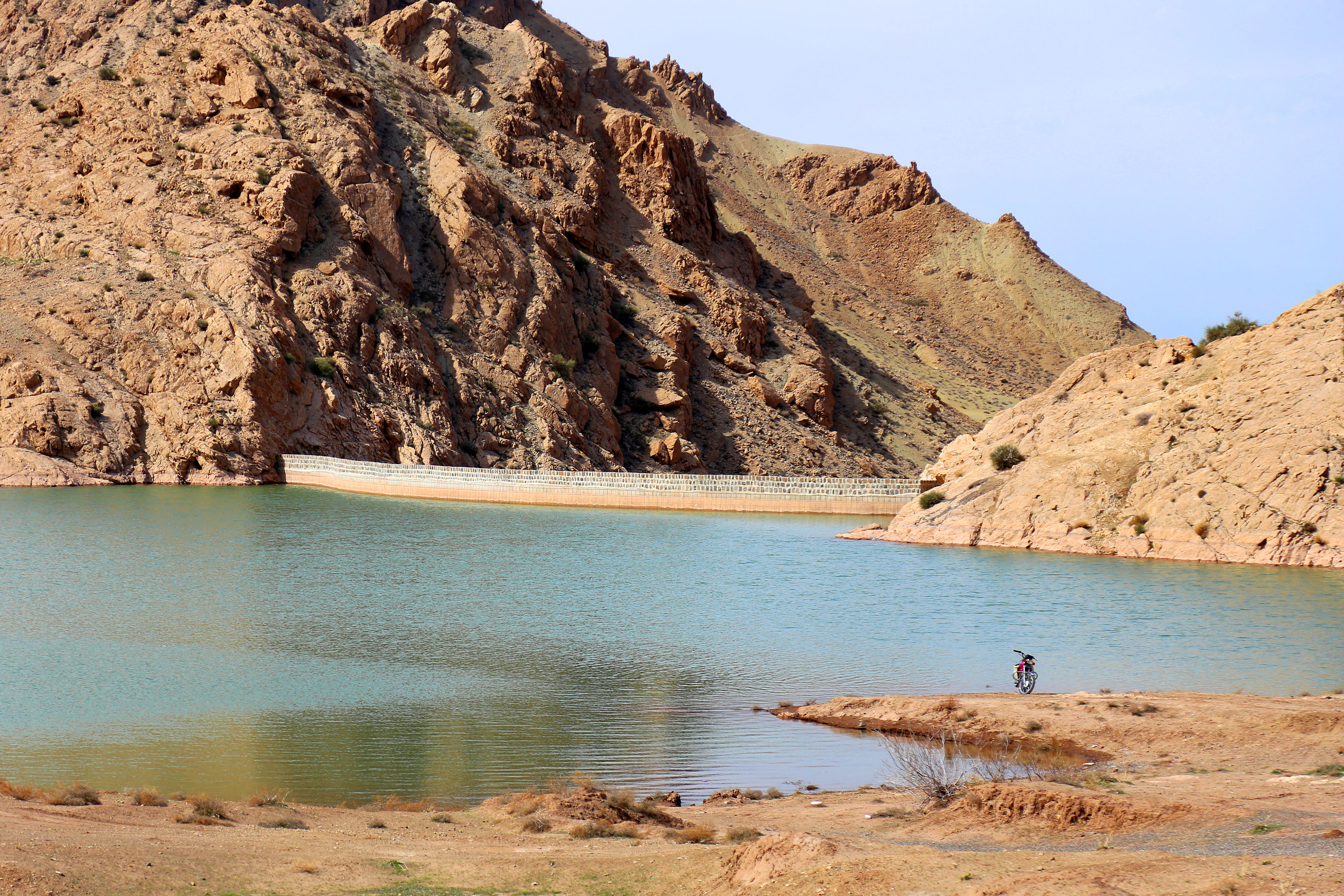
Kebar Dam

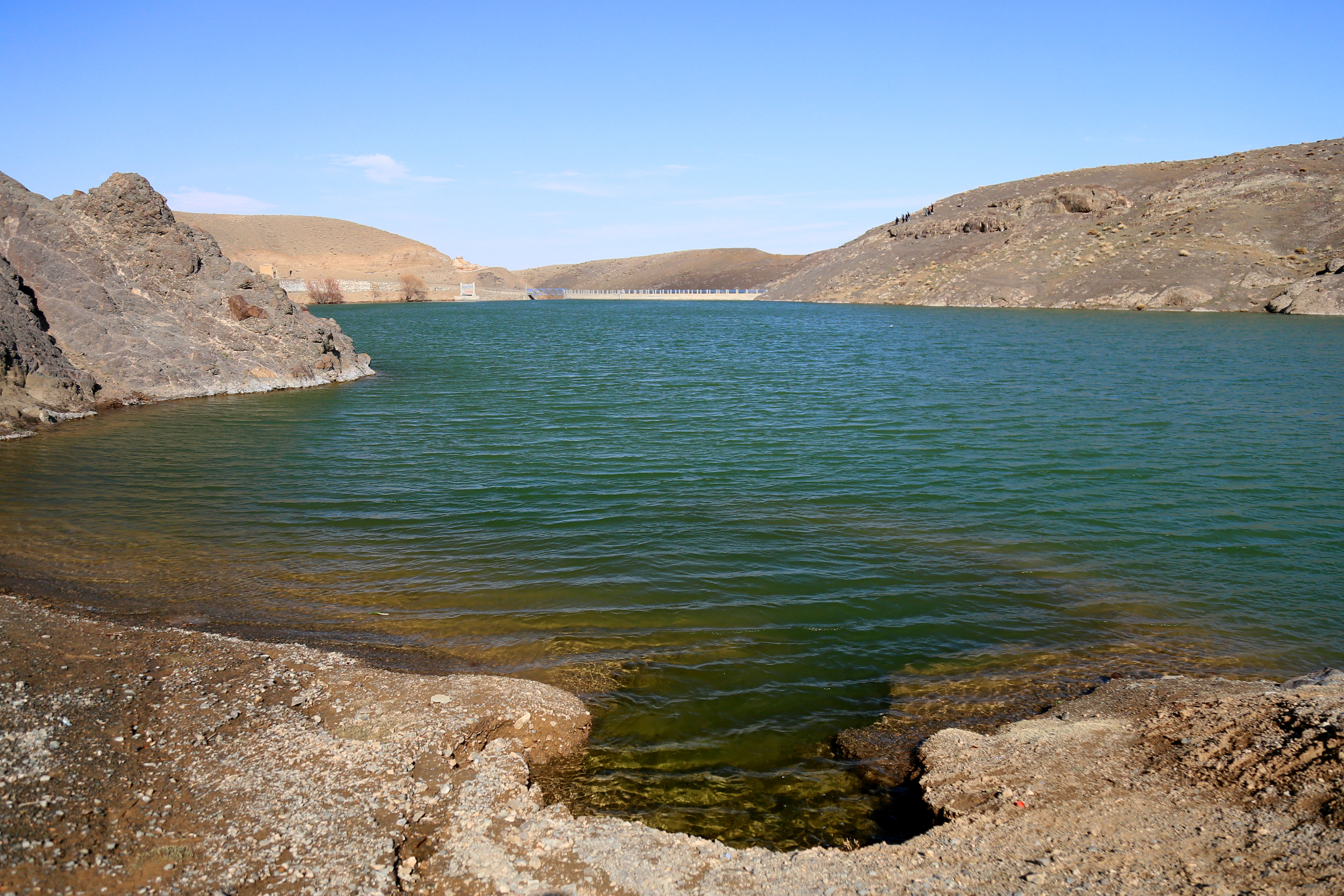
Senjegan Dam Lake

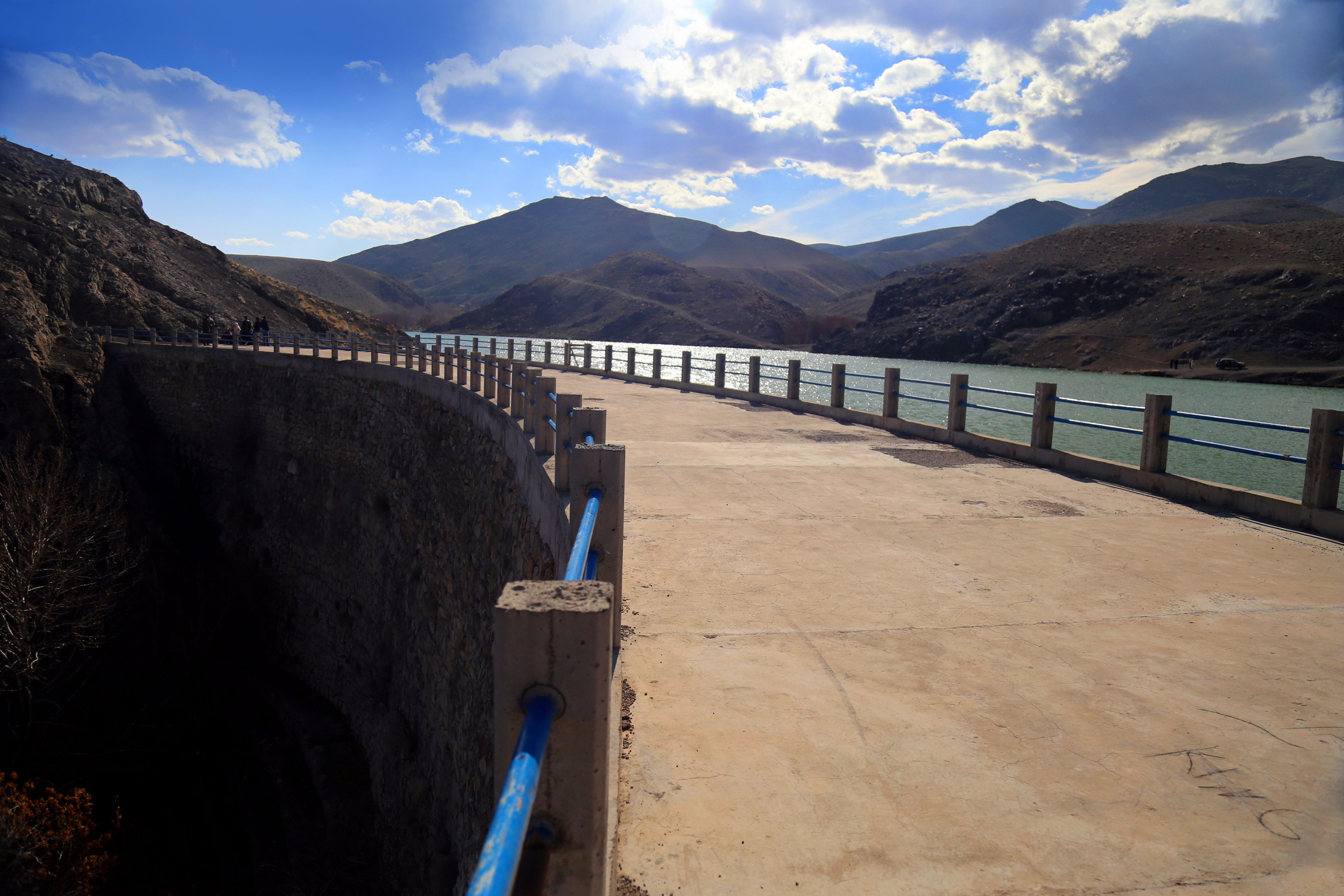
Senjegan Dam

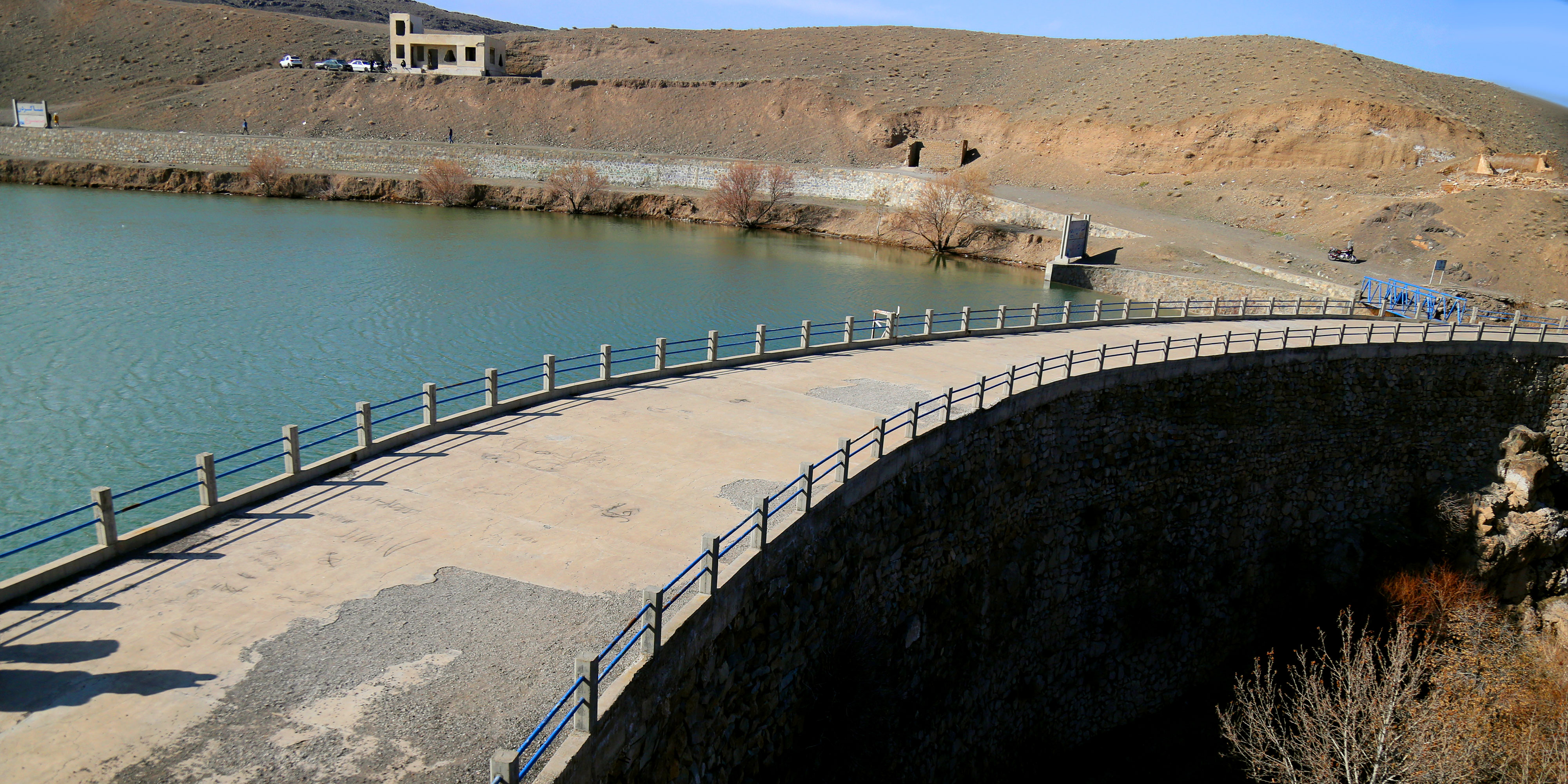
Senjegan Dam

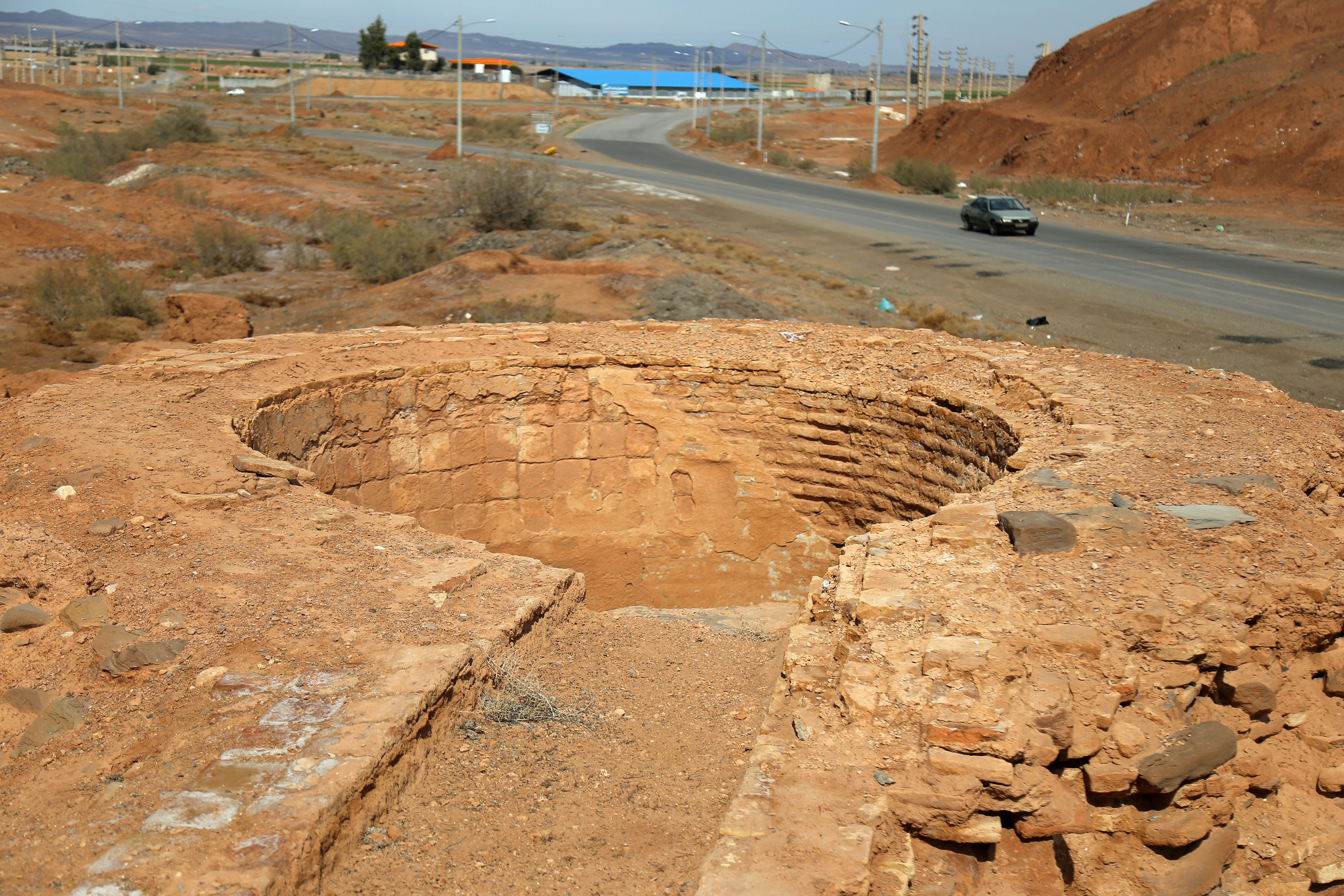
Alborz Mill

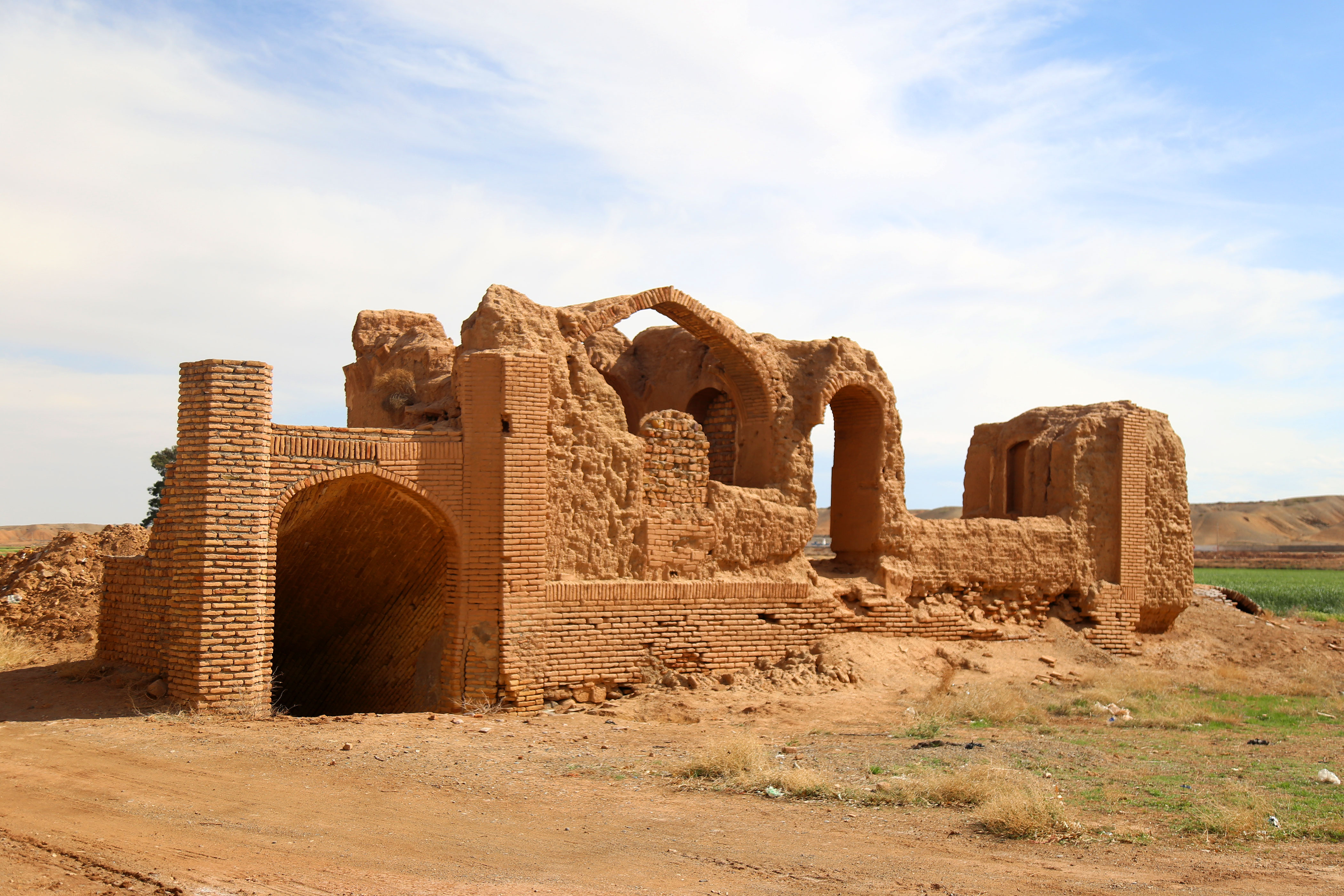
Alborz Caravanserai

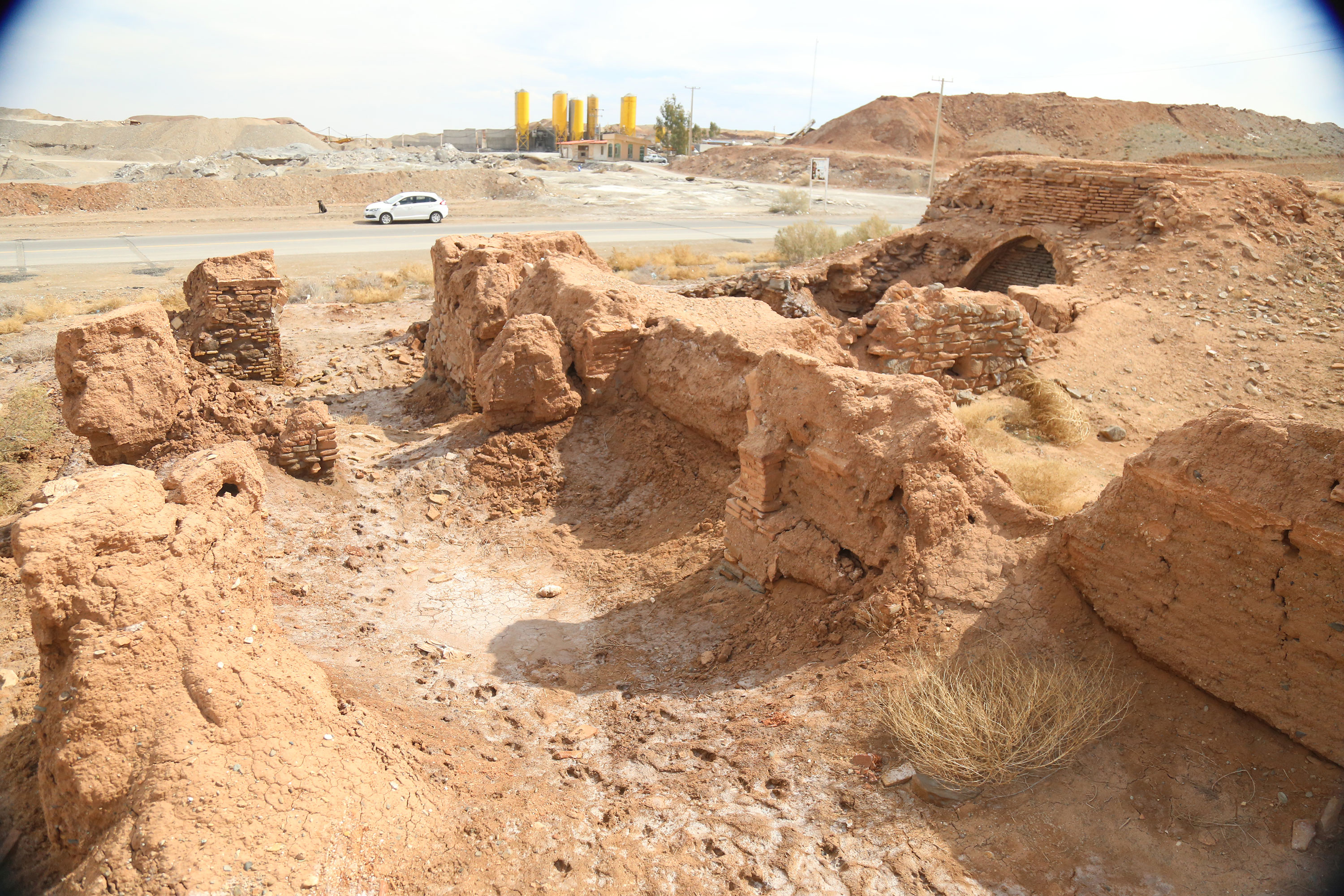
Alborz Mill

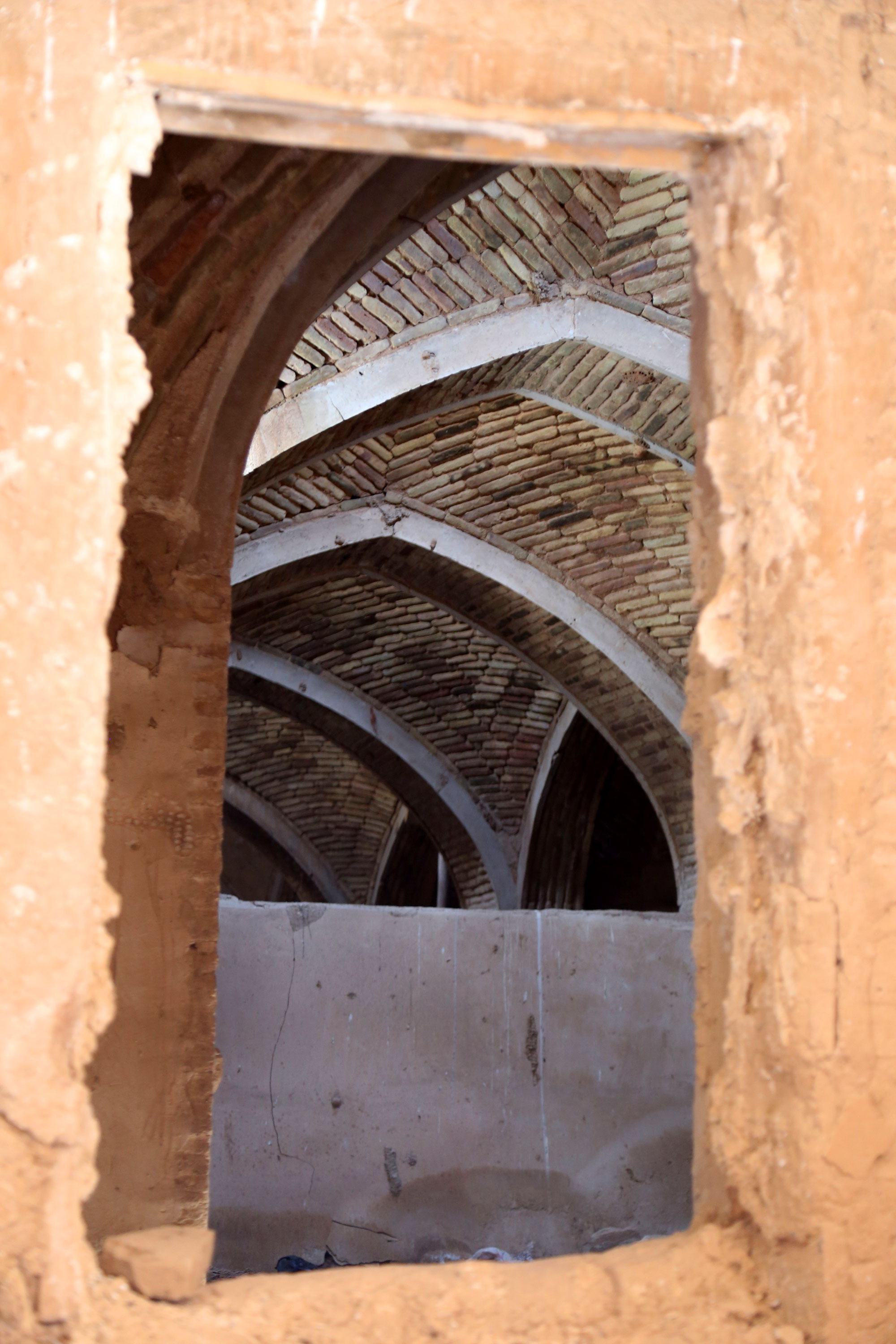
Alborz Caravanserai

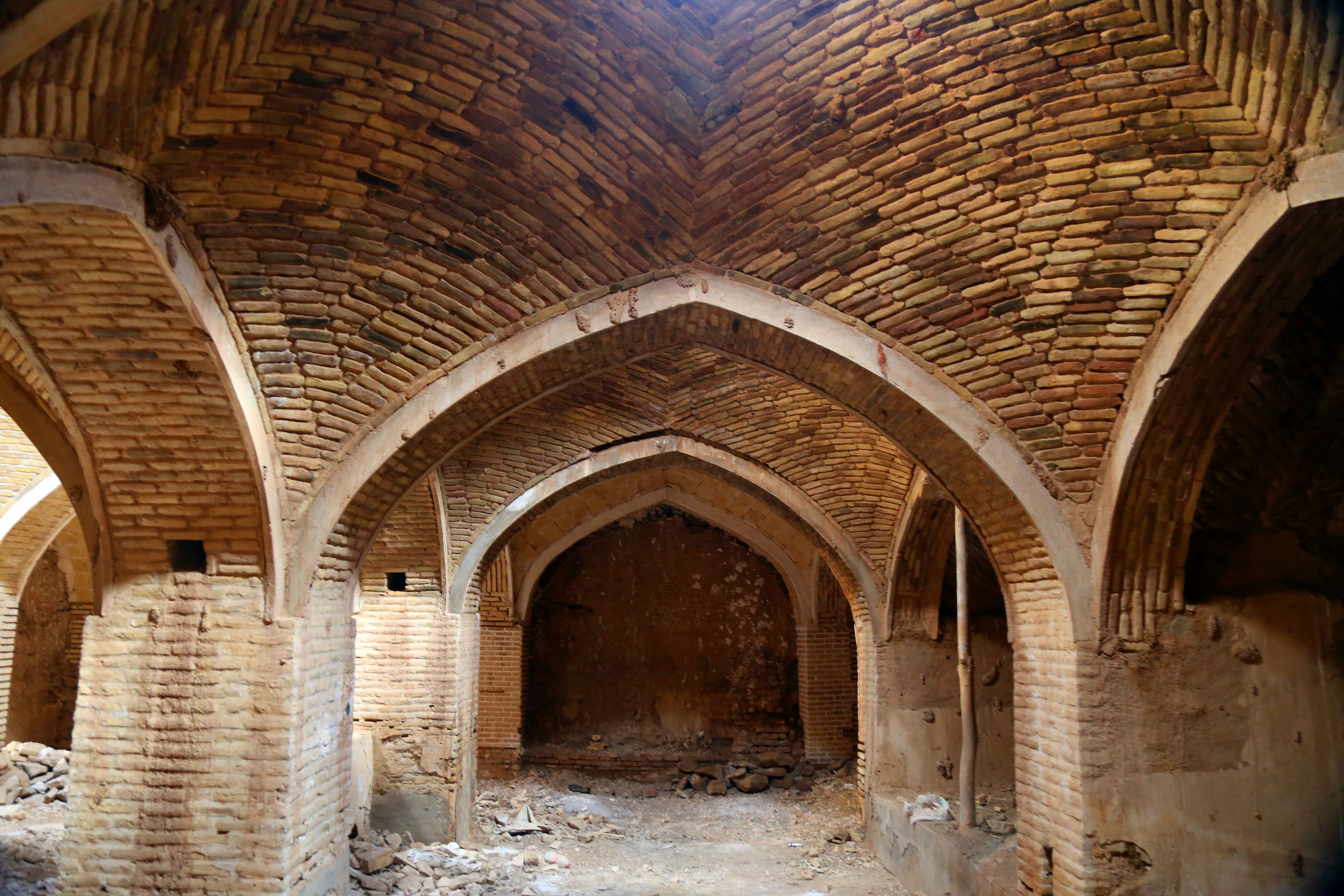
Alborz Caravanserai

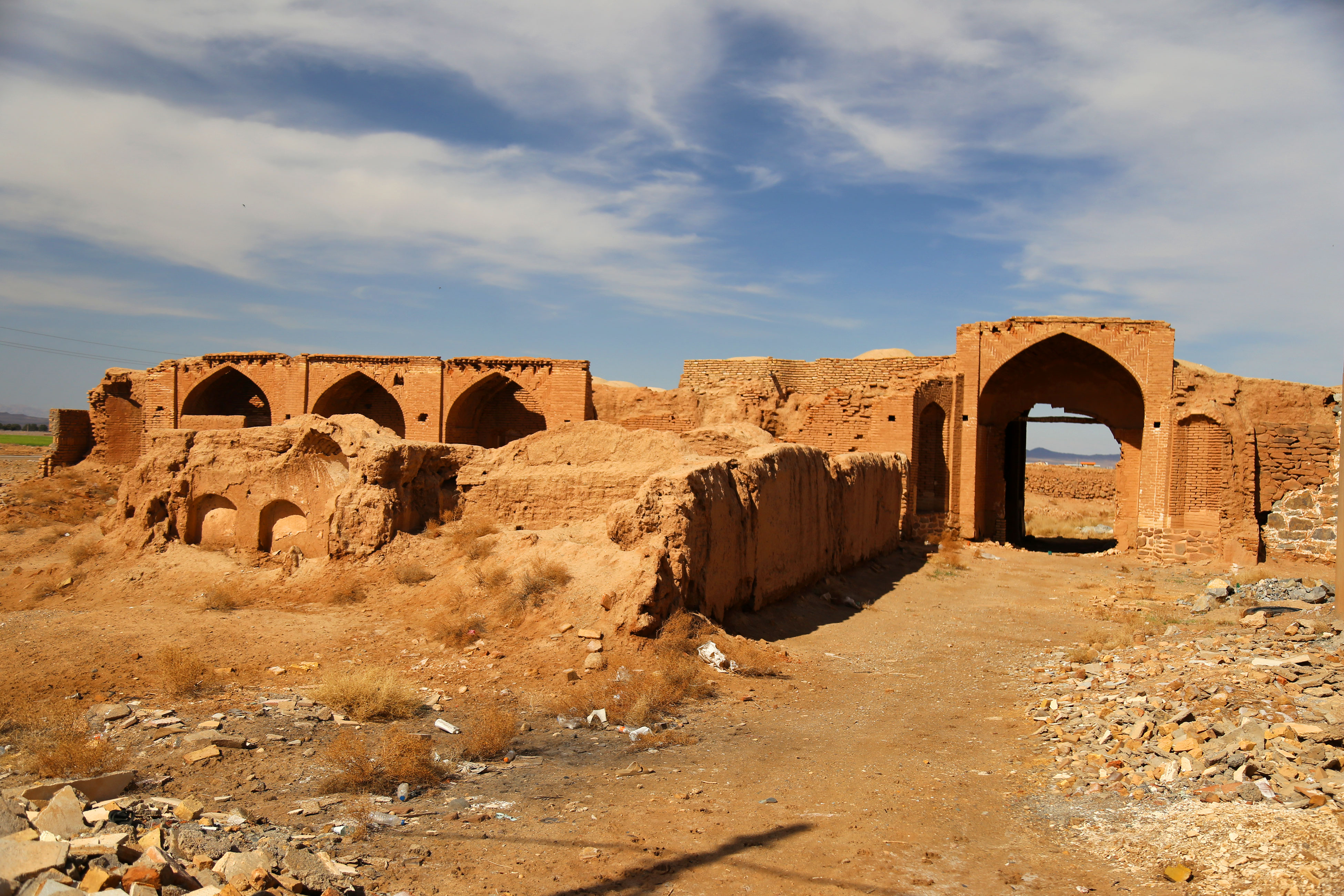
Alborz Caravanserai

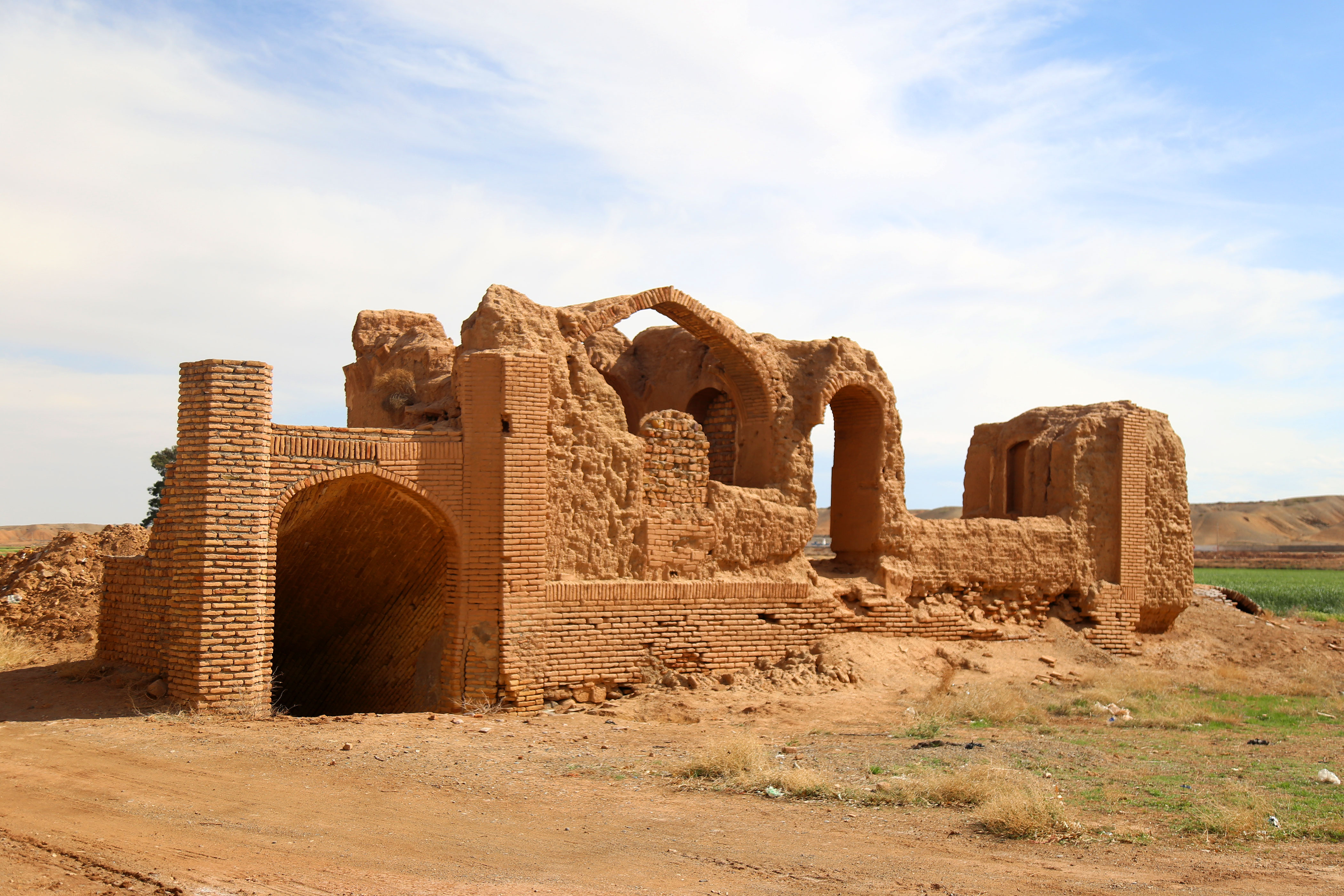
Alborz Caravanserai

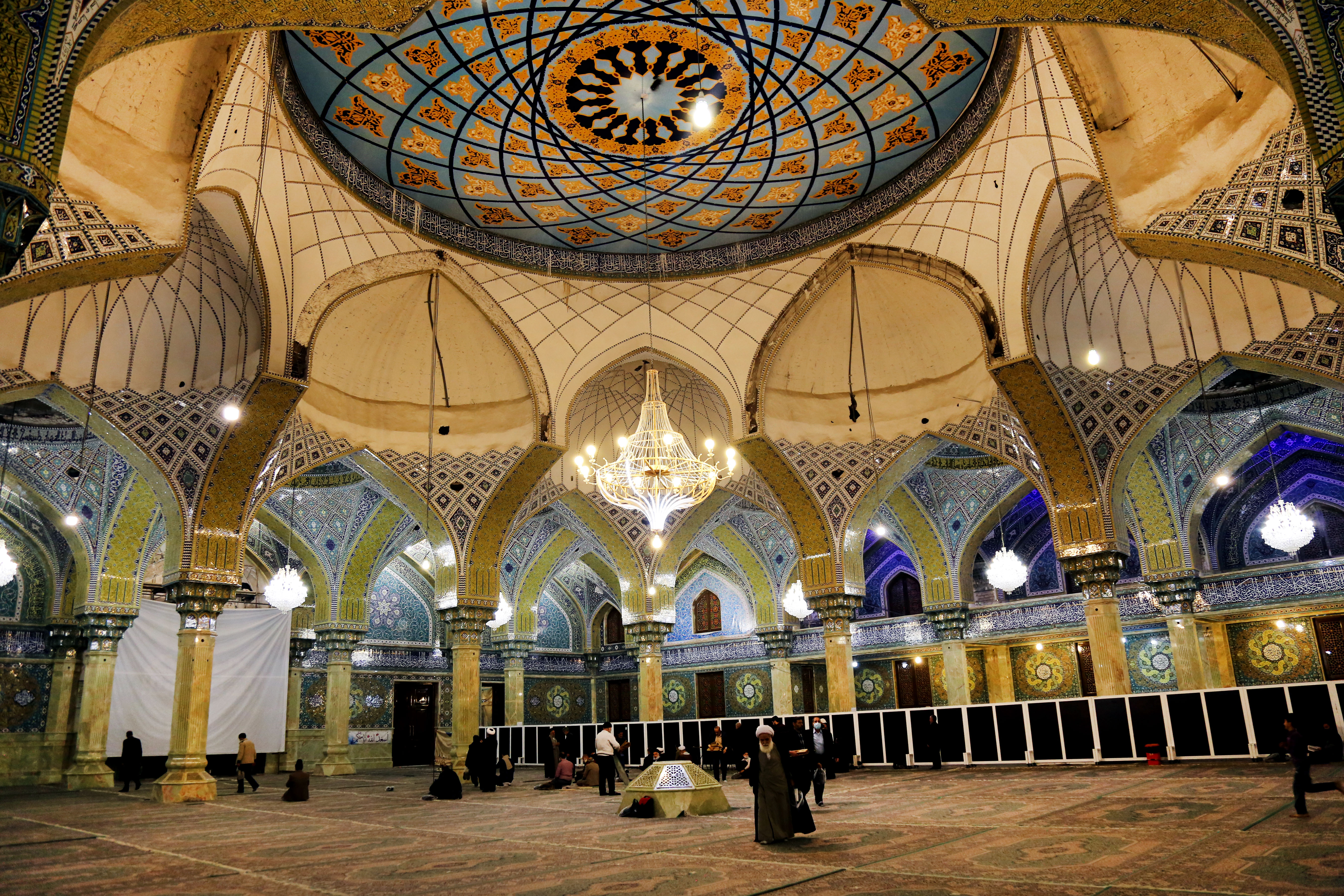
Imam Hassan Mosque

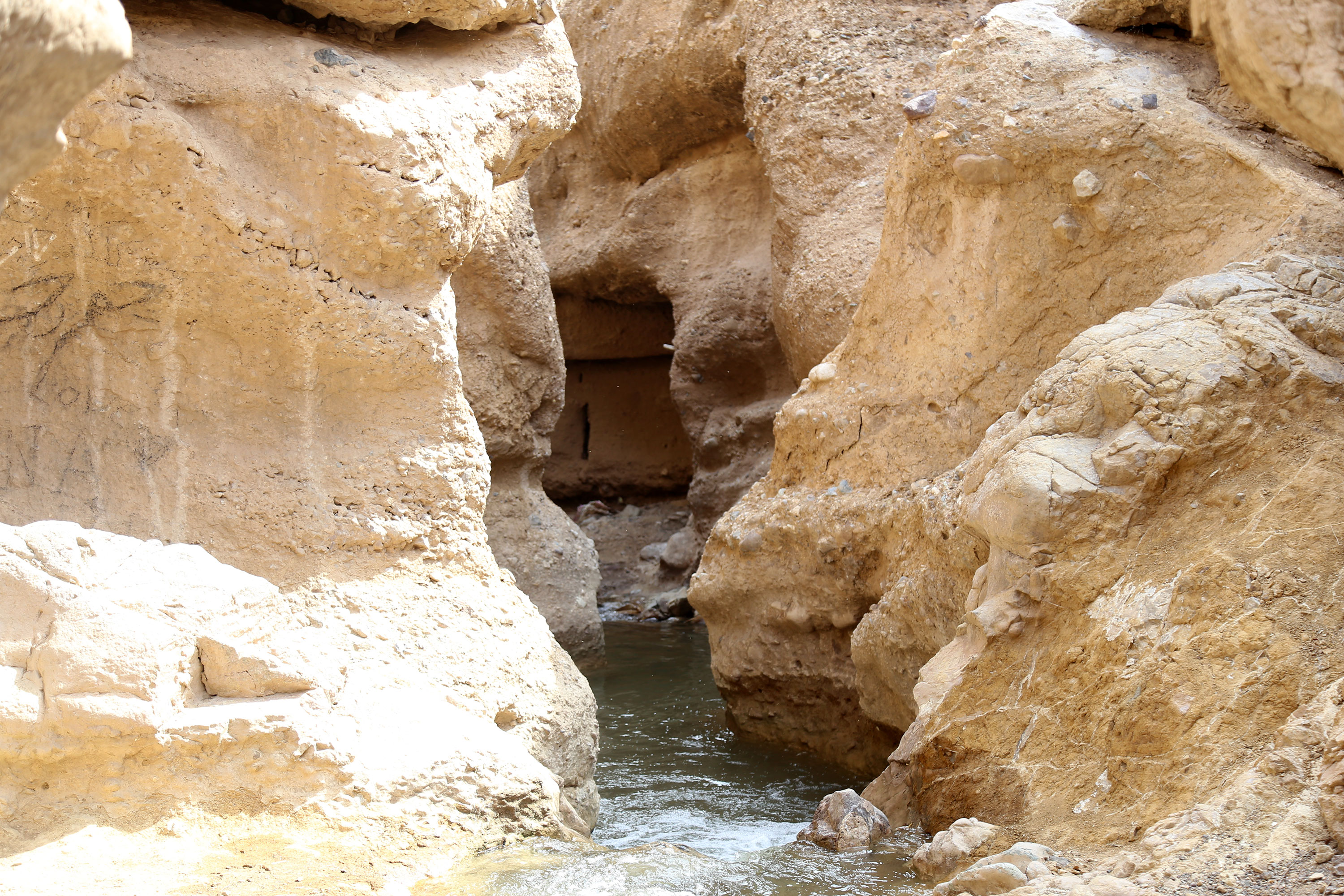
Ghahan Valley

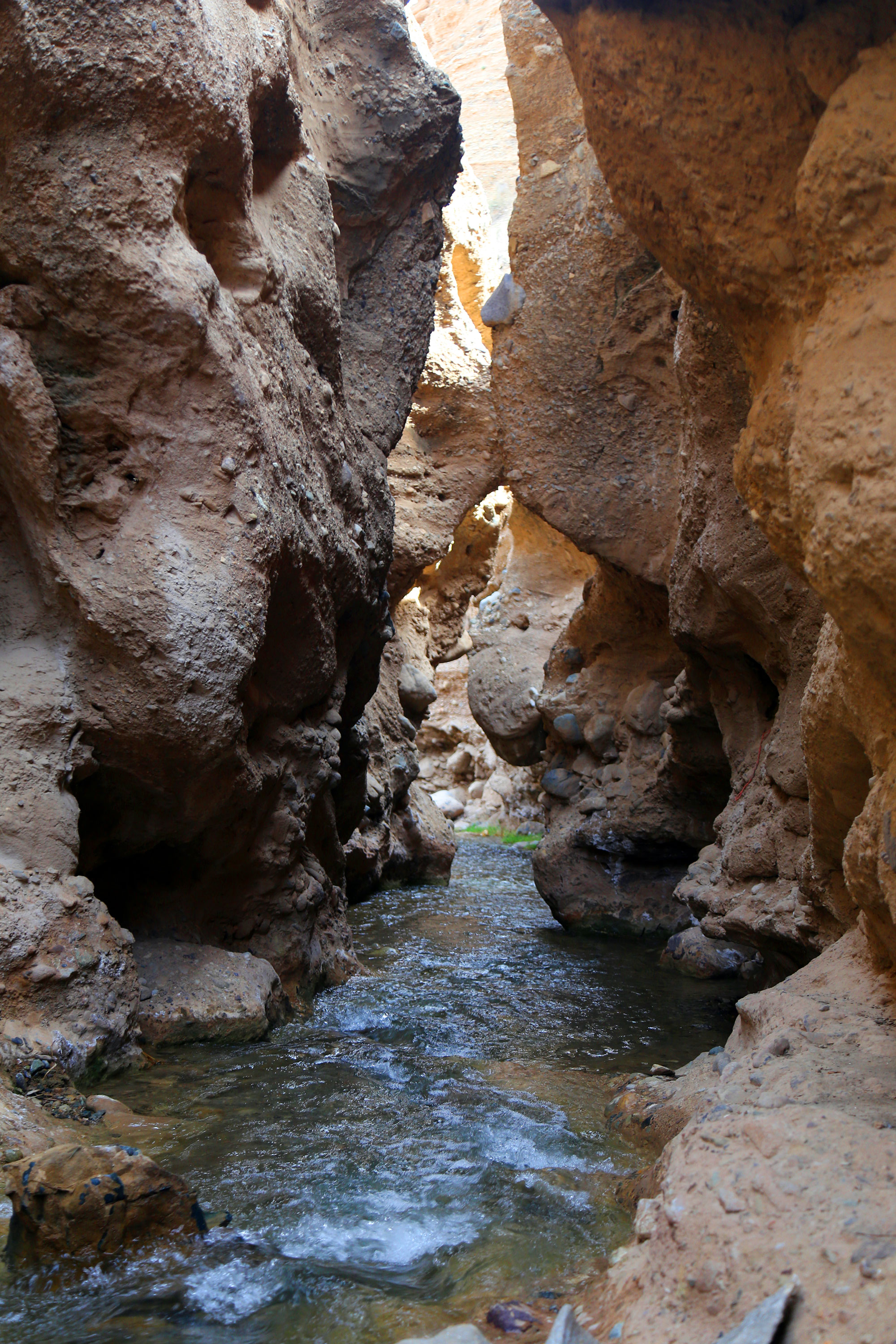
Ghahan Valley

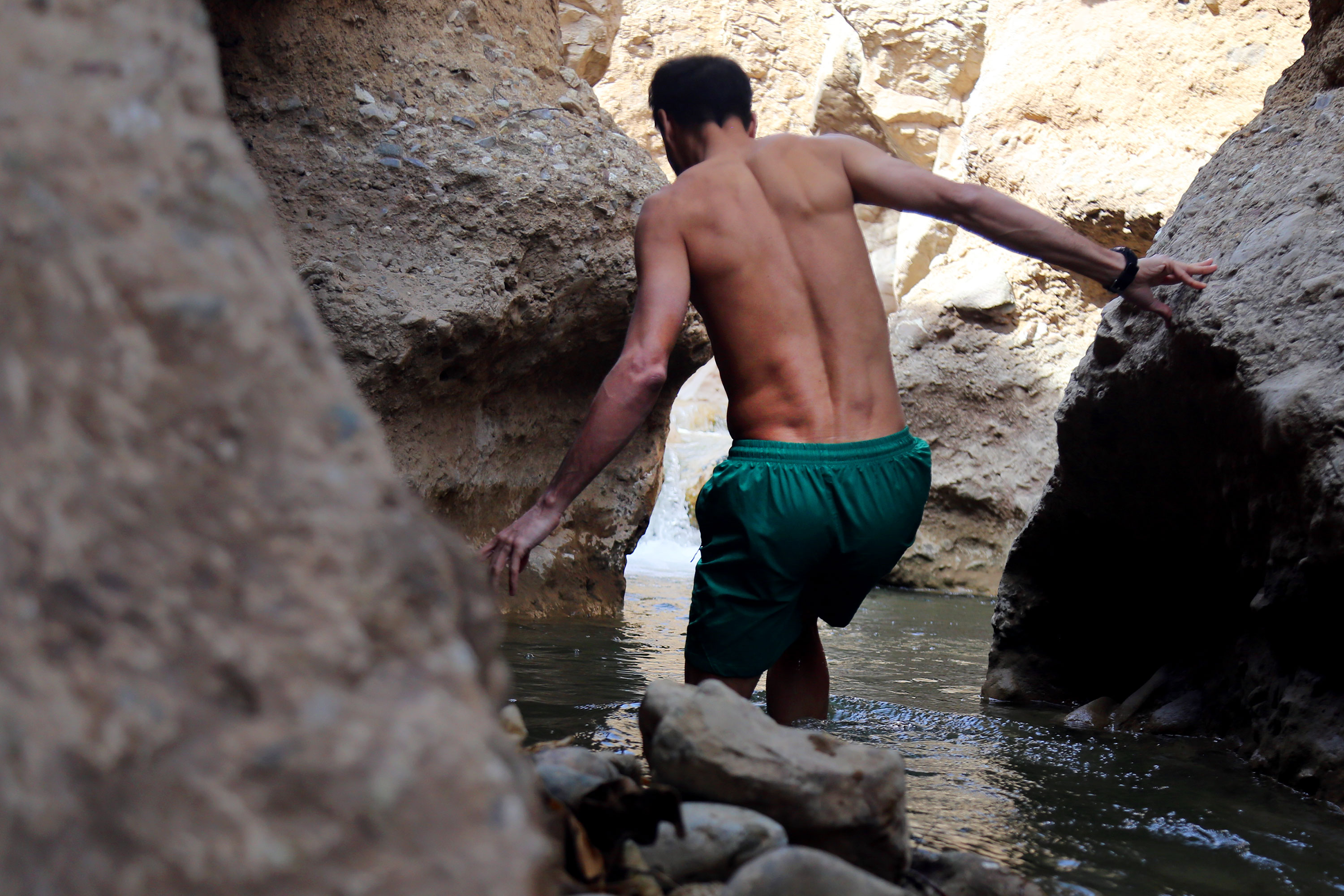
Ghahan Valley

== Bibliography ==
- Chisholm, Hugh, ed. (1911). "Kum" . Encyclopædia Britannica. Vol. 15 (11th ed.). Cambridge University Press. p. 945.
- Albert Houtum-Schindler (1897). "Province of Kom". Eastern Persian Irak. London: J. Murray and Royal Geographical Society. pp. 56+. hdl:2027/mdp.39015000658461.
