= Jameh Mosque of Pachian =

Shi'ite mosque in Pachian, Qom, Iran

Jāmeh Mosque of Pachian
- مسجد جامع پاچیان
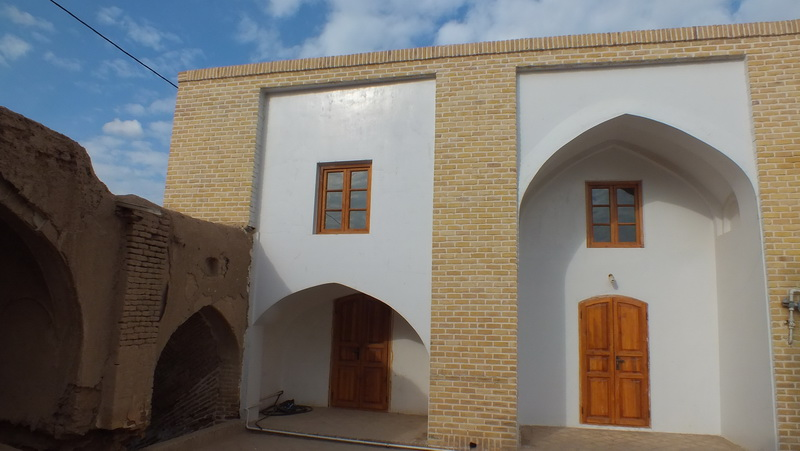
- The modern brick entrance to the ancient mosque in 2015

- Location of the mosque in Iran

Religion
- Affiliation: Shia Islam
- Ecclesiastical or organizational status: Friday mosque
- Status: Active

Location
- Location: Pachian, Jafarabad, Qom Province
- Country: Iran
- Interactive map of Jāmeh Mosque of Pachian
- Coordinates: 34°48′05″N 50°34′44″E

Architecture
- Type: Mosque architecture
- Style: Qajar
- Completed: Qajar era

Specifications
- Dome: One (maybe more)
- Materials: Bricks

Iran National Heritage List
- Official name: Jāmeh Mosque of Pachian
- Type: Built
- Designated: 16 March 2002
- Reference no.: 5676
- Conservation organization: Cultural Heritage, Handicrafts and Tourism Organization of Iran

The Jāmeh Mosque of Pachian (Persian: مسجد جامع پاچیان; Arabic: جامع باتشيان) is a Shi'ite Friday mosque (jāmeh), located in the village of Pachian, in the district of Jafarabad, in the province of Qom, Iran. The mosque was built during the Qajar era.

The mosque was added to the Iran National Heritage List on 16 March 2002, administered by the Cultural Heritage, Handicrafts and Tourism Organization of Iran.

== Gallery ==
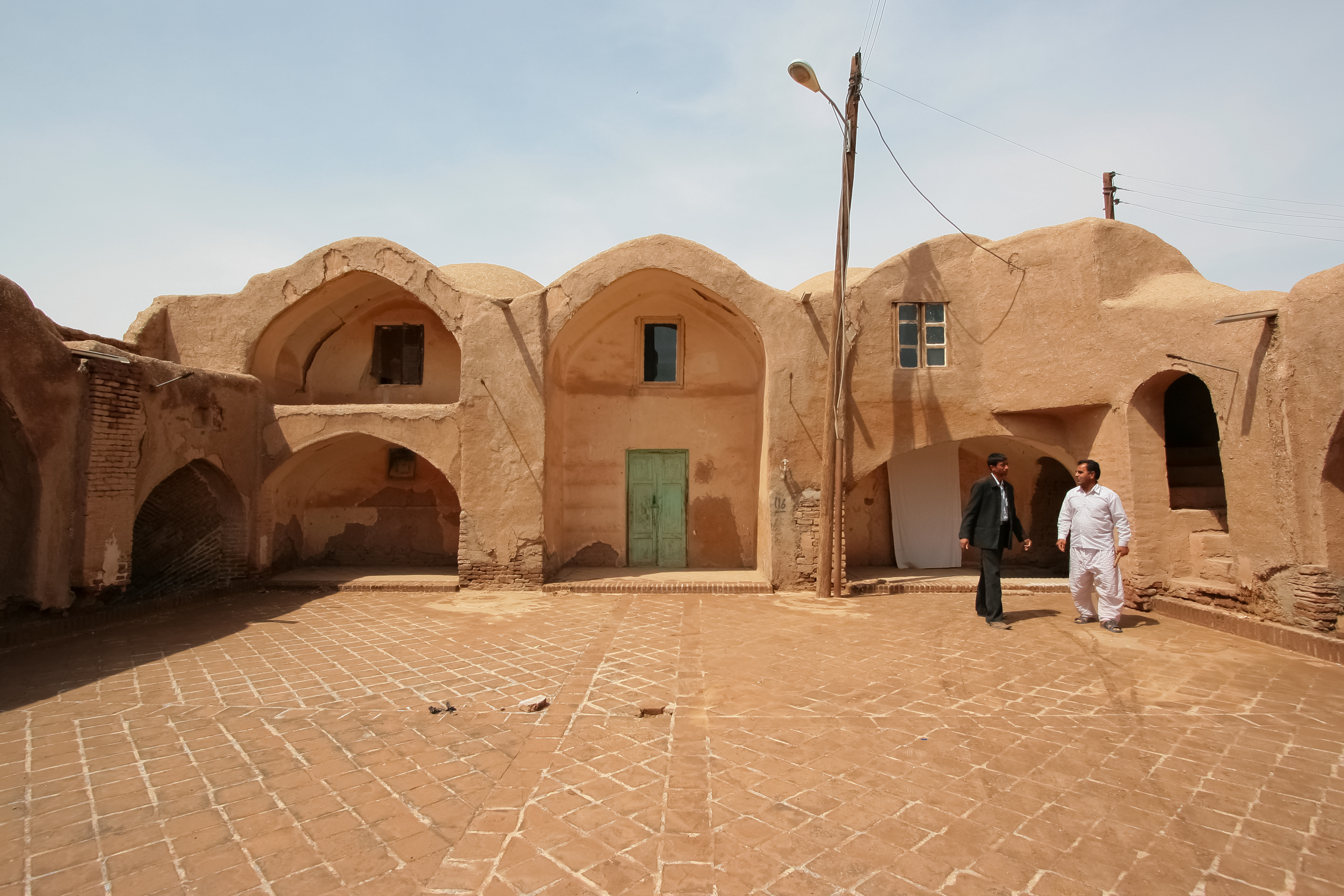

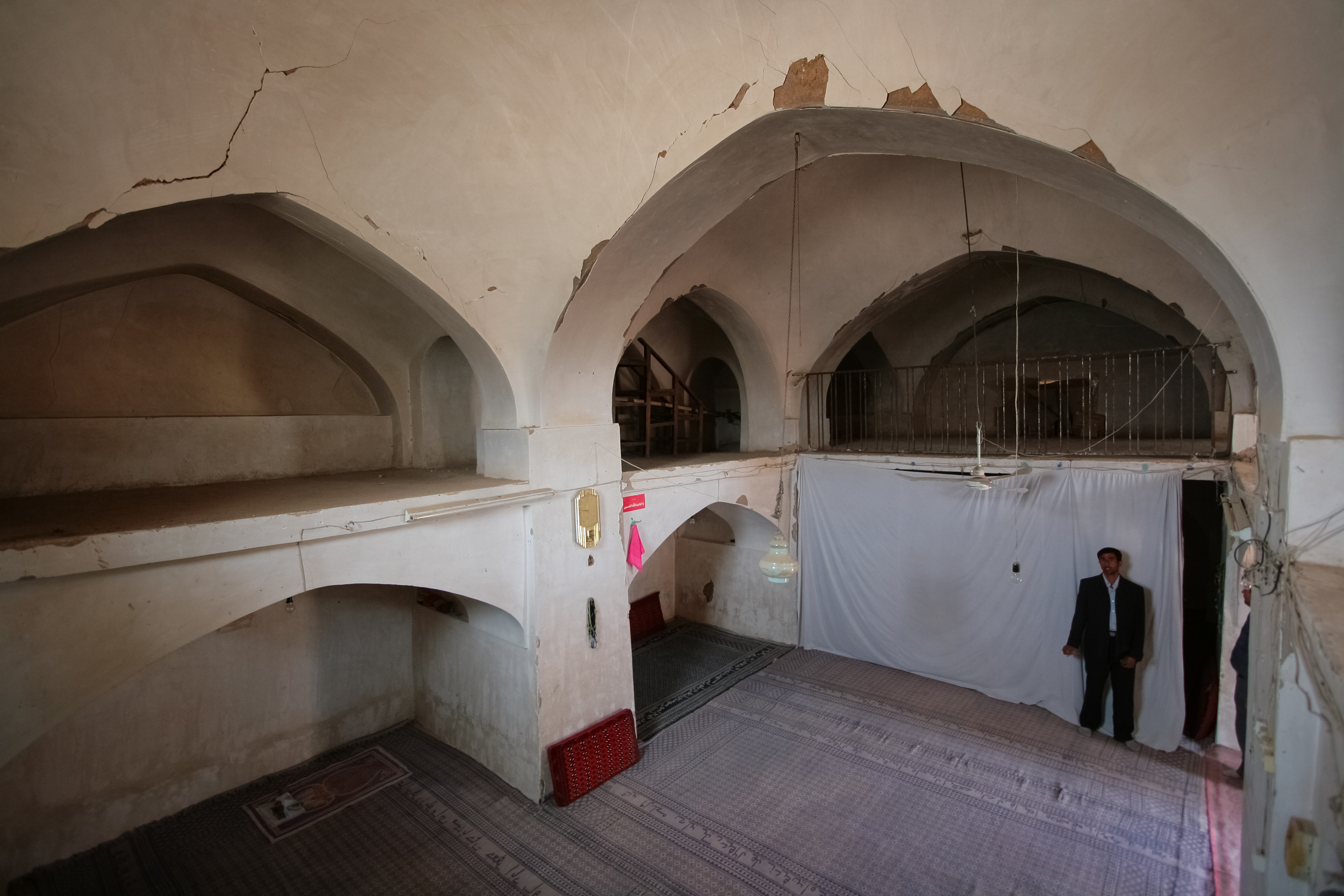

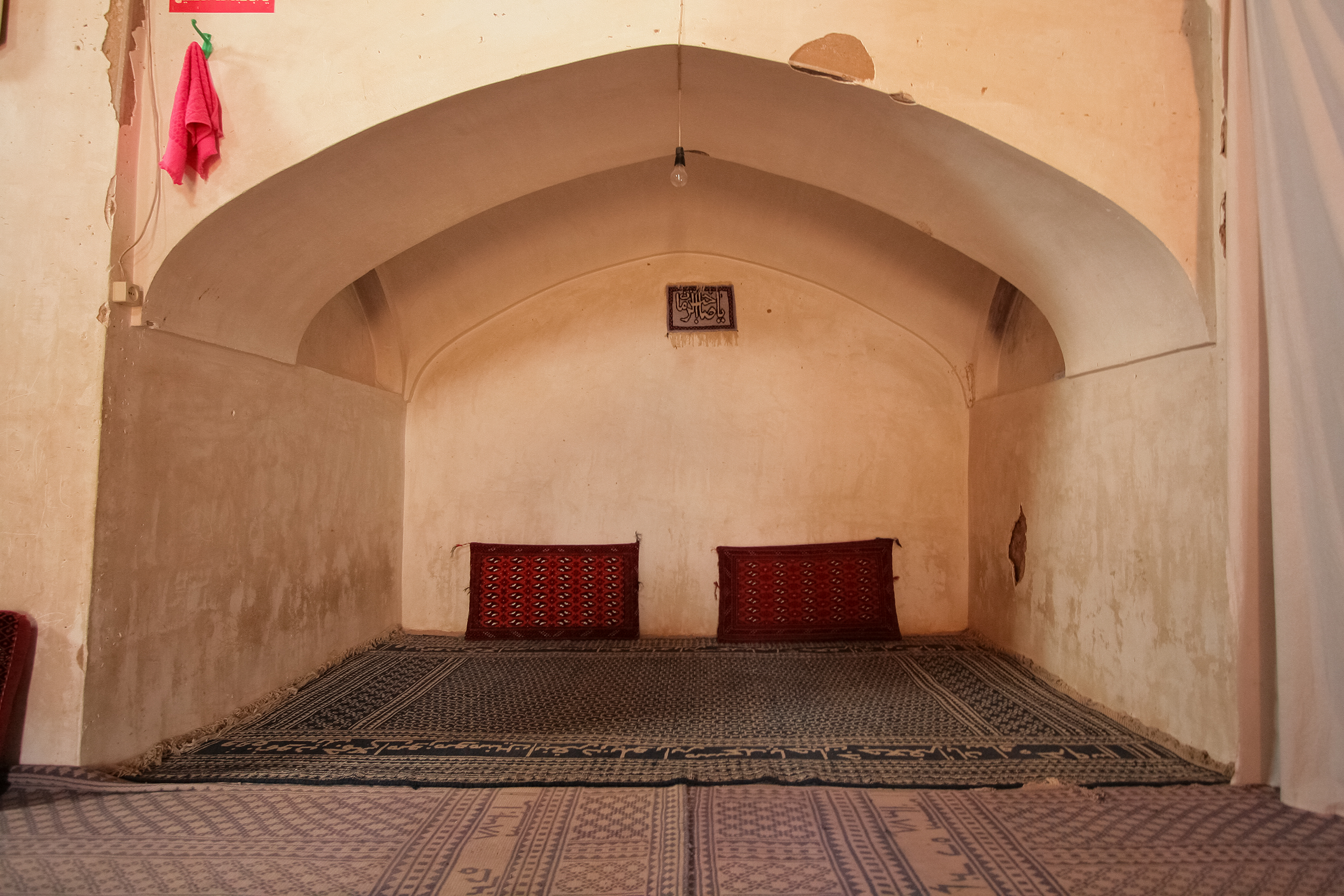

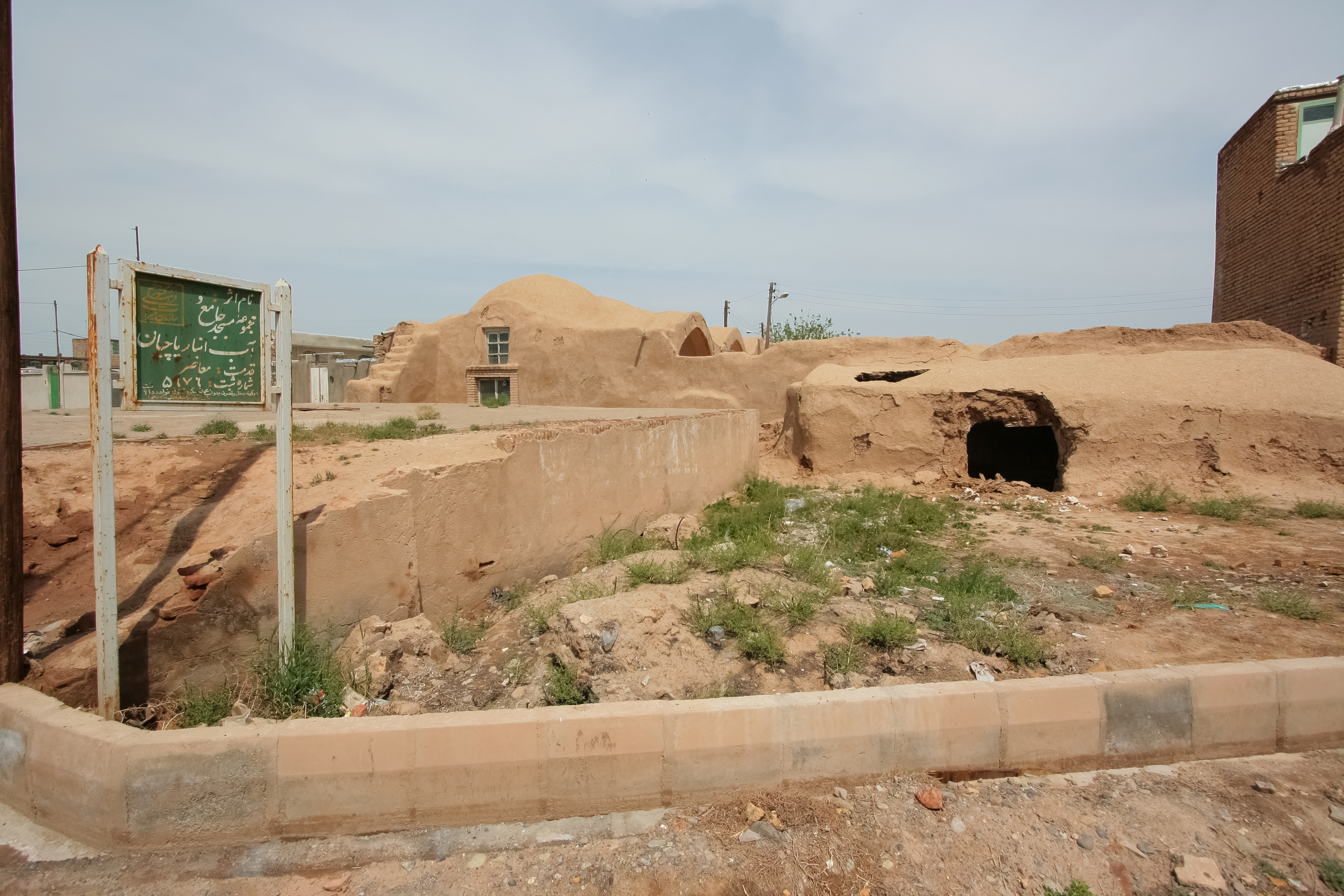

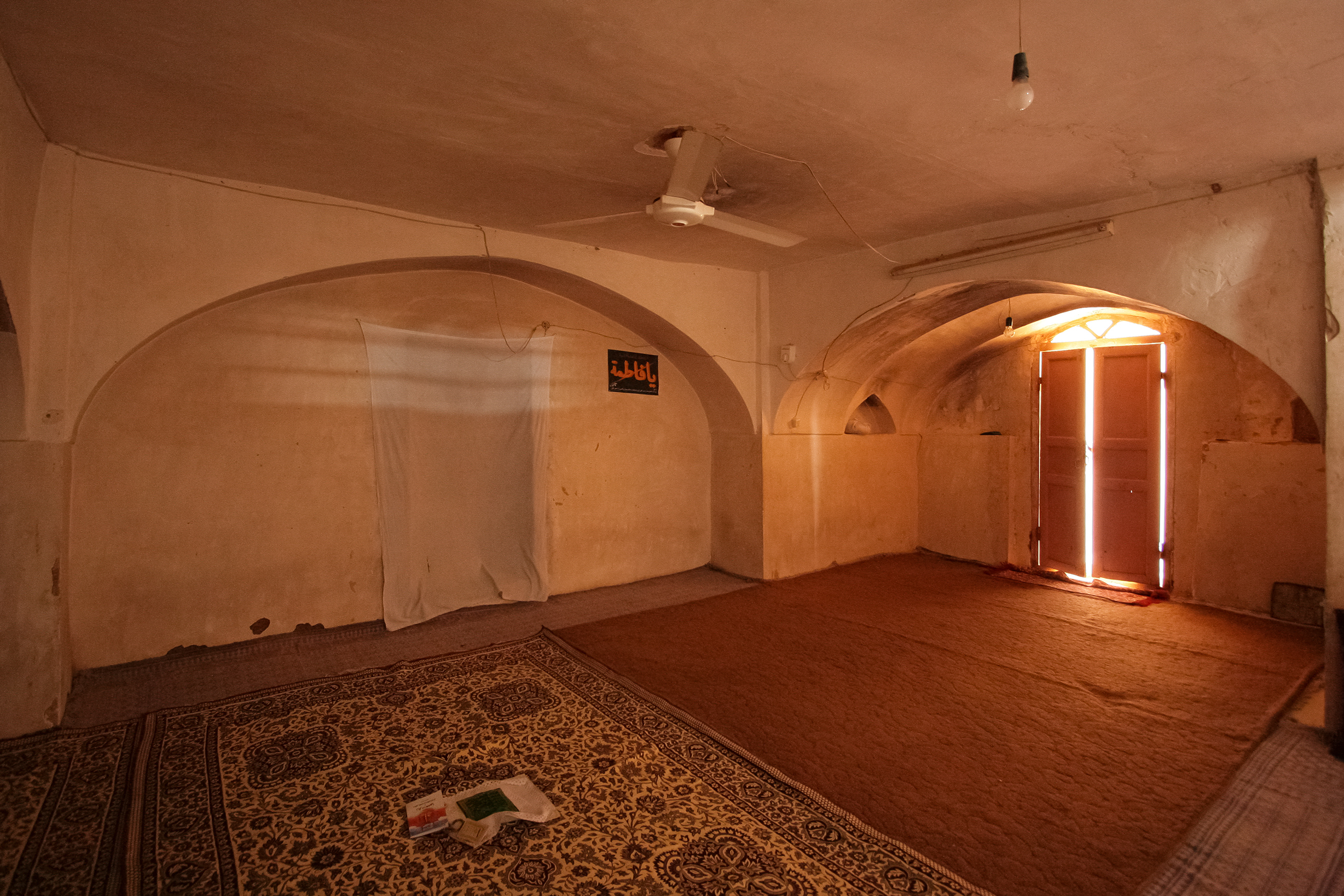

== See also ==
- Shia Islam in Iran
- List of mosques in Iran
