= Sardar Mosque =

Shi'ite mosque in Urmia, West Azerbaijan Province, Iran

- مسجد سردار
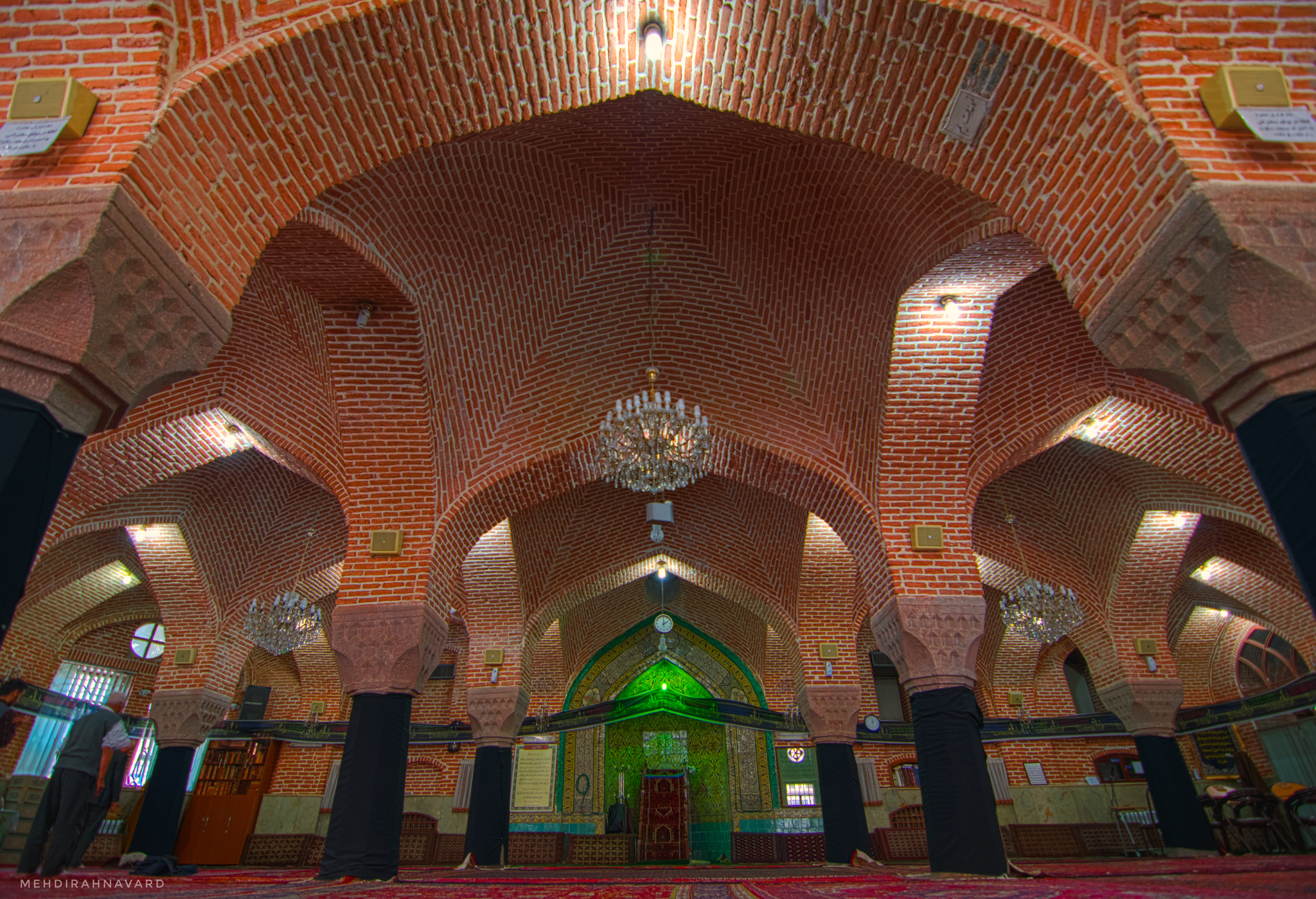
- The mosque interior in 2017

- Location of the mosque in Iran

Religion
- Affiliation: Shia Islam
- Ecclesiastical or organizational status: Mosque
- Status: Active

Location
- Location: Urmia, West Azerbaijan province
- Country: Iran
- Interactive map of Sardar Mosque
- Coordinates: 37°32′59″N 45°4′18″E

Architecture
- Type: Mosque architecture
- Style: Qajar; Pahlavi
- Completed: c. 1810s CE; 1912 CE (renovations)

Specifications
- Interior area: 22 by 18 m (72 by 59 ft)
- Dome: One (maybe more)
- Minaret: One (clock tower)
- Materials: Bricks; stone; tiles

Iran National Heritage List
- Official name: Sardar Mosque
- Type: Built
- Designated: 1 July 1996
- Reference no.: 1738
- Conservation organization: Cultural Heritage, Handicrafts and Tourism Organization of Iran

The Sardar Mosque (Persian: مسجد سردار; Arabic: مسجد سردار), variously spelled as the Saat Mosque, the Saatlu Mosque, and the Saatloo Mosque, is a Shi'ite mosque, located on Imam Street, near the Menareh Mosque, in Urmia, (Note: Also spelled as Orumieh.) in the province of West Azerbaijan, Iran. The mosque was commenced in c. 1810s CE, during the Qajar era and completed in 1912 CE, during the Pahlavi era.

The mosque was added to the Iran National Heritage List on 1 July 1996, administered by the Cultural Heritage, Handicrafts and Tourism Organization of Iran.

== Overview ==
The mosque was constructed during the Qajar period. In 1951 CE, a huge clock was affixed on the entrance and was then reputedly known as the Sa'atloo Mosque. It has interesting architectural design which was constructed of brick during the Qajar period. The mosque is in two sections, the basement and a long hall. The brick mosque has a 22-metre (72 ft) shabestan with twelve stone octagonal decorated pillars. The walls of the shabestan are covered in green tiles. There is a border of pink, white, blue, yellow and green colored tiles with floral motifs. A small entrance connects the large Shabistan to a smaller one that has no ornate decorations.

There is a small mehrab with colorful tilework and Quranic inscriptions on the southern part of the shabastan. The other designs and beauty of this mosque, the rainbow tiles which are designed with blue, pink, green, white and brown color and Ayat-Al-Korsi is written inside one of the margins around the mehrab.

== Gallery ==
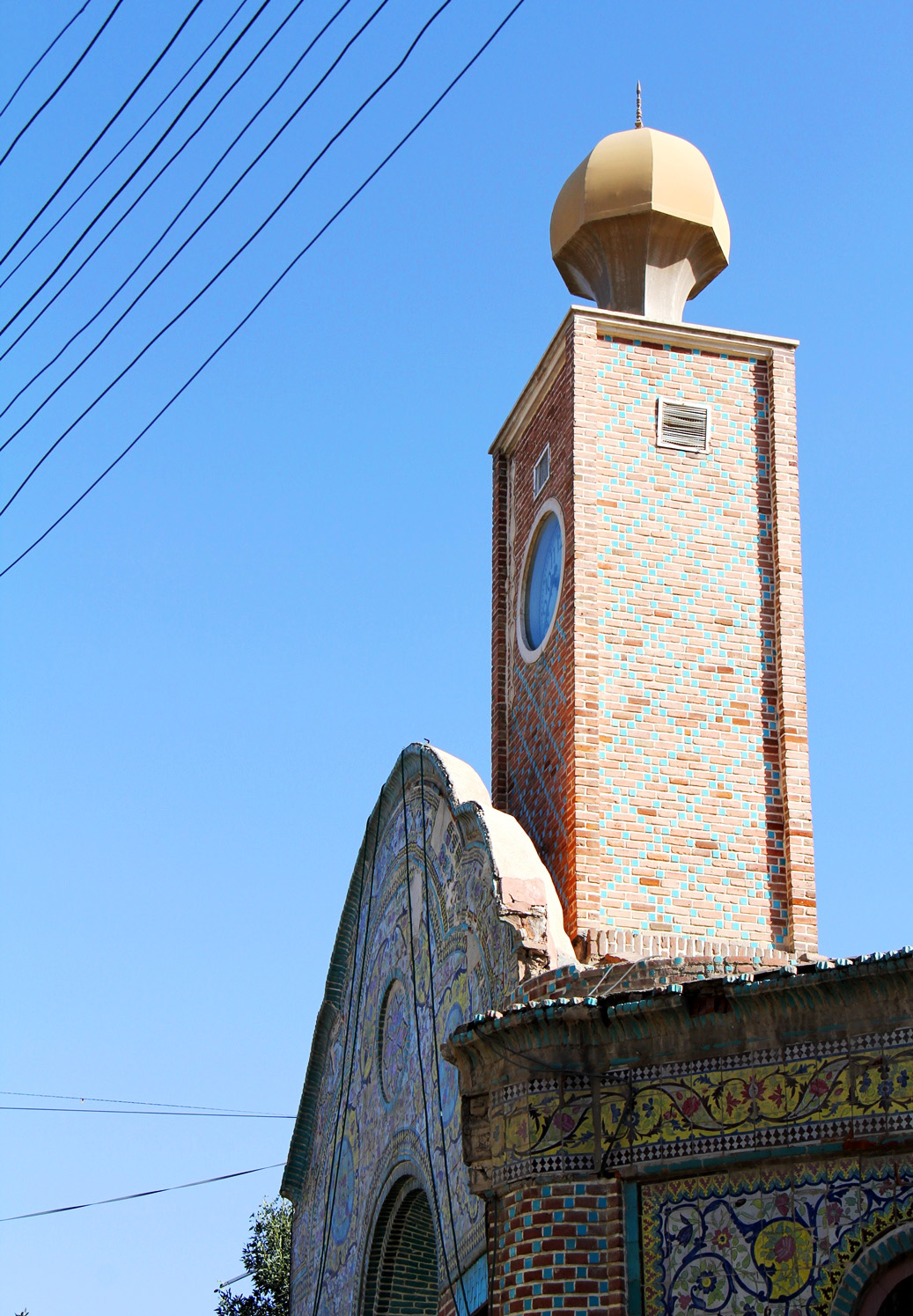
The mosque clocktower

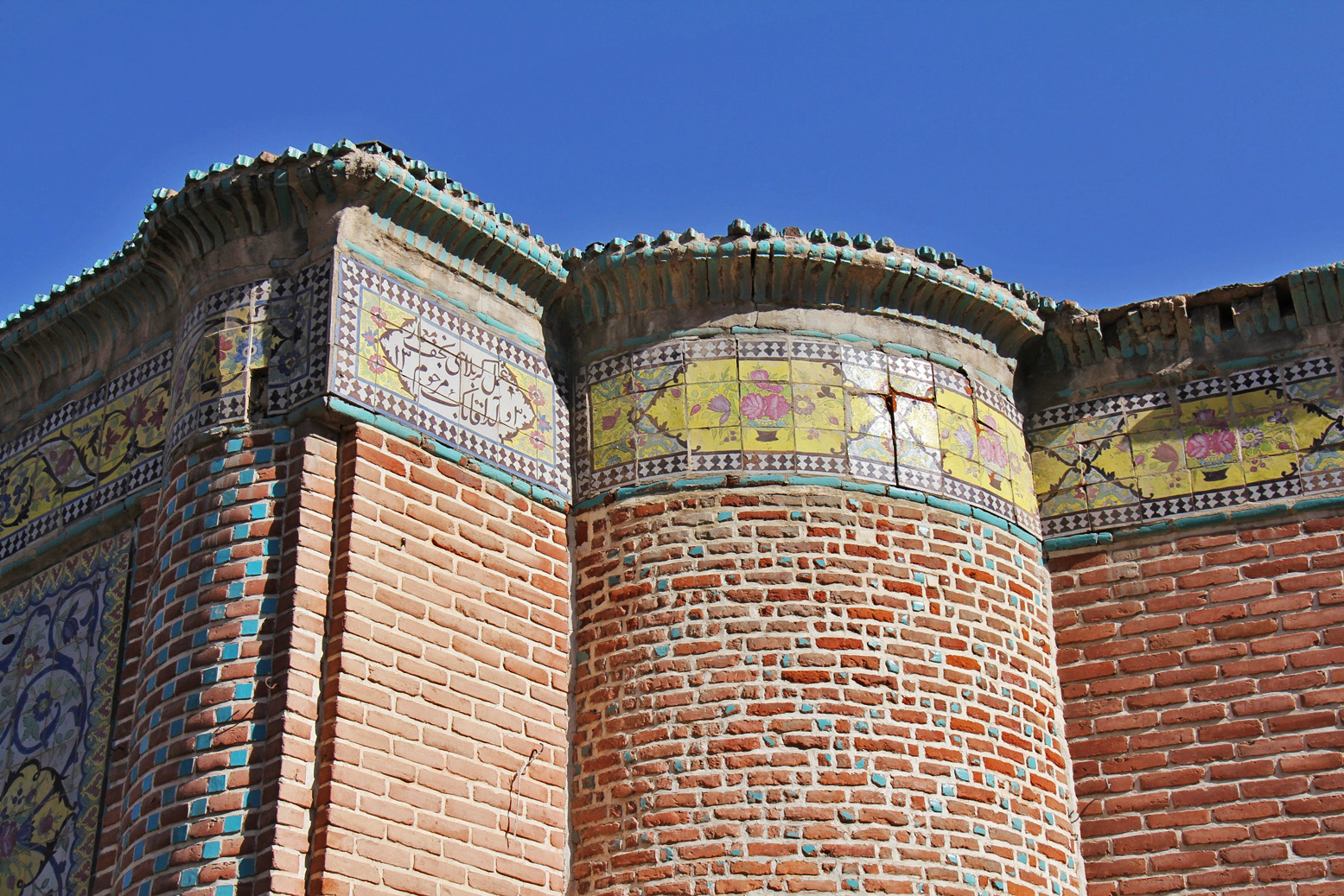

== See also ==
- Shia Islam in Iran
- List of mosques in Iran
