= Menareh Mosque =

Shi'ite mosque in Urmia, West Azerbaijan Province, Iran

- مسجد مناره
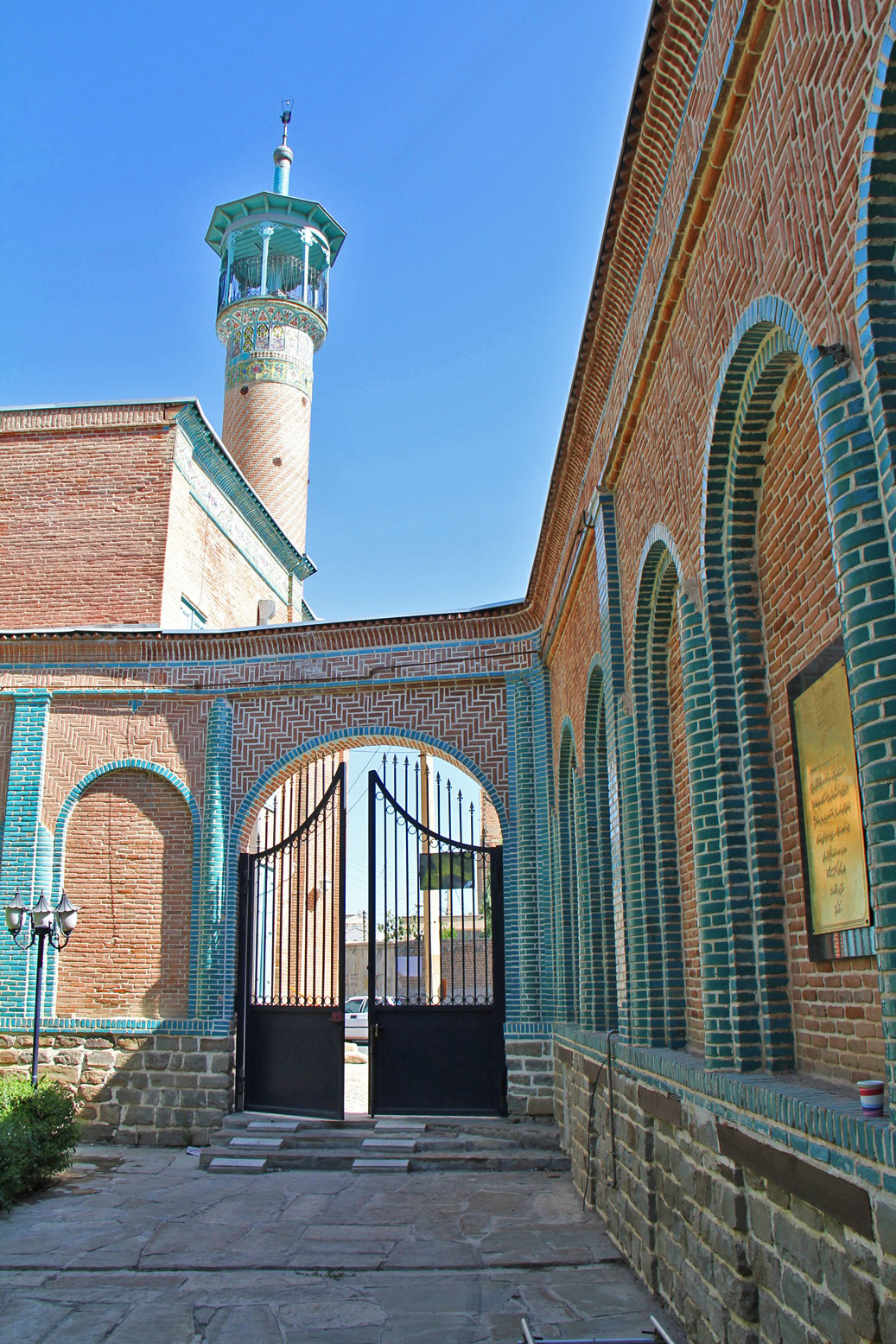

- Location of the mosque in Iran

Religion
- Affiliation: Shia Islam
- Ecclesiastical or organisational status: Mosque
- Status: Active

Location
- Location: Urmia, West Azerbaijan province
- Country: Iran
- Interactive map of Menareh Mosque
- Coordinates: 37°33′4″N 45°4′14″E

Architecture
- Type: Mosque architecture
- Style: Qajar
- Completed: 1910 CE

Specifications
- Length: 15 m (49 ft)
- Width: 14 m (46 ft)
- Interior area: 450 m^{2} (4,800 sq ft)
- Dome: One
- Minaret: One
- Minaret height: 22.5 m (74 ft)
- Materials: Stone; bricks; timber

Iran National Heritage List
- Official name: Menareh Mosque
- Type: Built
- Designated: 7 December 1997
- Reference no.: 153
- Conservation organization: Cultural Heritage, Handicrafts and Tourism Organization of Iran

The Menareh Mosque (Persian: مسجد مناره; Arabic: مسجد المنارة) is a Shi'ite mosque, located in Urmia, Imam Street near the Sardar Mosque, in Urmia, in the province of West Azerbaijan, Iran. The mosque was completed in 1910 CE, during the Qajar era, and is named due to its minaret.

The mosque was added to the Iran National Heritage List on 7 December 1997, administered by the Cultural Heritage, Handicrafts and Tourism Organization of Iran.

== Gallery ==
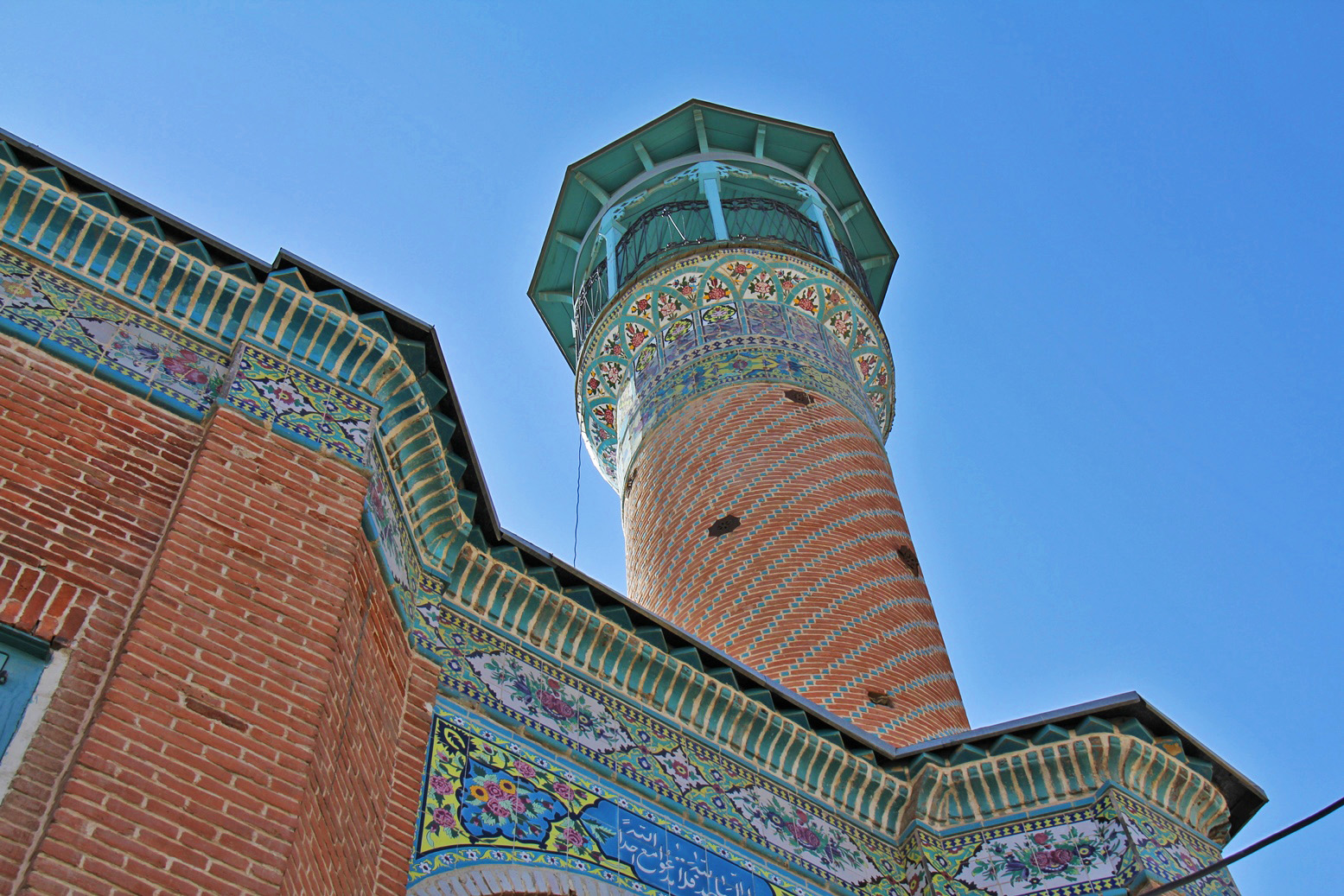

== See also ==
- Shia Islam in Iran
- List of mosques in Iran
