= Jameh Mosque of Tehran =

Mosque in Tehran, Iran

Jāmeh Mosque of Tehran
- مسجد جامع بازار تهران
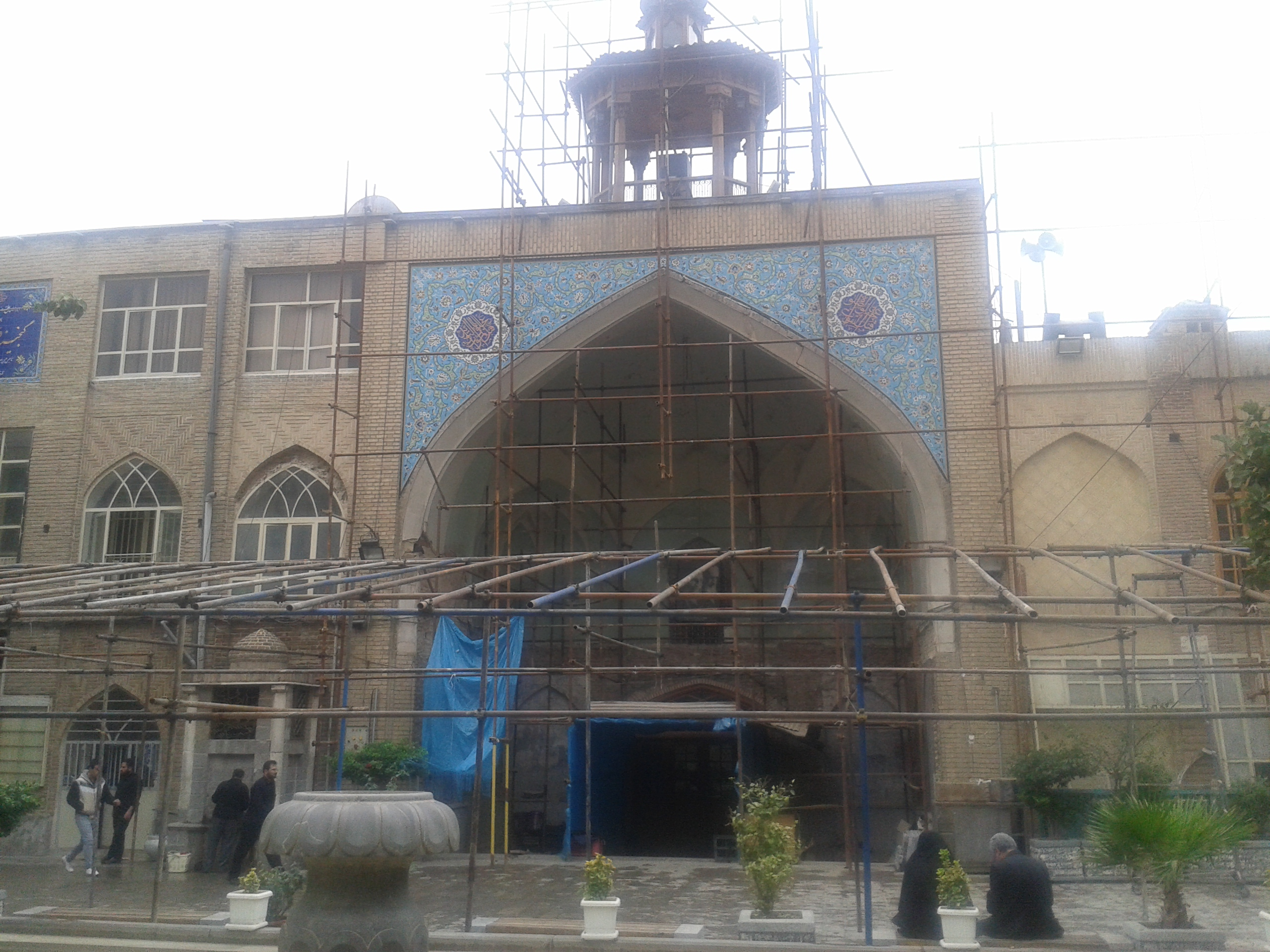
- The mosque entrance, in 2017

- Location of the mosque in Tehran

Religion
- Affiliation: Shia Islam
- Ecclesiastical or organizational status: Friday mosque
- Status: Active

Location
- Location: Jameh Mosque Alley, Grand Bazaar, Tehran, Tehran Province
- Country: Iran
- Interactive map of Jāmeh Mosque of Tehran
- Coordinates: 35°40′31″N 51°25′27″E

Architecture
- Type: Mosque architecture
- Style: Buyid; Safavid; Qajar
- Completed: 10-11th century CE (prime); 1072 AH (1661/1662 CE) (expansion)

Specifications
- Interior area: 20,000 m^{2} (220,000 sq ft)
- Dome: One (maybe more)

Iran National Heritage List
- Official name: Jāmeh Mosque of Tehran
- Type: Built
- Designated: 9 December 1996
- Reference no.: 1793
- Conservation organization: Cultural Heritage, Handicrafts and Tourism Organization of Iran

The Jāmeh Mosque of Tehran (Persian: مسجد جامع بازار تهران; Arabic: جامع طهران), also known as the Atiq Mosque and also called the Bazaar Jāmeh Mosque and the Tehran Central Mosque, is a Shi'ite Friday mosque (jāmeh), located in the city of Tehran, in the province of Tehran, Iran. Situated adjacent to the Grand Bazaar, it is the oldest mosque in the city, with its oldest Shabestan, built in the 10th or 11th century CE, during the Al-e Bouyeh era.

The mosque was added to the Iran National Heritage List on 9 December 1996, administered by the Cultural Heritage, Handicrafts and Tourism Organization of Iran.

== Architecture ==
There is no accurate information available on the exact date of construction of the Jāmeh Mosque of Tehran. However, the architecture of its different parts indicate the gradual formation of the mosque over time, including covering the Al-e Bouyeh, Safavid and Qajar periods. Due to the selection of Tehran as the capital, the Jāmeh Mosque was renovated and expanded. Therefore, no artifact older than the 13th century AH can be found in the mosque, although the date of construction of the mosque may be before the aforementioned periods.

Ahmad Jamei believes that the background of some parts of the current mosque building dates from the Al-e Bouyeh era, during the 10th or 11th century CE. The oldest existing document that show the mosque is a map of Tehran by the French Girchmann dated in 1275 AH (1858/1859 CE) that shows the Jāmeh Mosque almost in its present form, complete with all the current porches.

It is known that the mosque was extensively remodelled in 1072 AH (1661/1662 CE), its south shabestan remodelled in 1202 AH (1787/1788 CE), iwans to the south and east completed in 1240 AH (1824/1825 CE) and 1252 AH (1836/1837 CE) respectively, the mihrab refined in 1344 AH (1925/1926 CE), renovations completed in 1366 AH (1946/1947 CE), and a library added in 1389 AH (1969/1970 CE).

== See also ==
- Shia Islam in Iran
- List of mosques in Iran
