= Iran during the Caliphate =

Impacts of Islamic rules under the name of Caliphate on Iran

A Sasanian-style gilt silver dish, 8th century CE, made in Iran under the Caliphate, depicting a royal figure with strongly Arab features hunting a lion.

In 633 CE, the Arab invasion of Iran began, and finally in 651 CE it would lead to the fall of the Sassanid Empire and Iran would come under the rule of the Rashidun, Umayyad and Abbasid caliphs.

== Rashidun Caliphate ==
The Rashidun caliphate or the early caliphate, was the first Islamic state under the name of Caliphate, which appeared on the day of the death of the Islamic prophet Muhammad in 8 June 632 CE (28 Safar 11 AH) and it lasted until the year 661 CE (40 AH). The rulers were from the Companions of Muhammad and from the Quraysh tribe, respectively, Abu Bakr (ruled 632 to 634), Omar ibn al-Khattab (ruled 634 to 644), Uthman ibn Affan (ruled 644 to 656) and Ali ibn Abi Talib (ruled 656 to 661).

The Arab invasion of Iran or the conquest of Iran by the Muslims began in 633 CE during the caliphate of Abu Bakr, reached its peak during Omar and during the Uthman period leading to the complete fall of the Sassanid government in 651 CE (30 AH) and the killing of Yazdegerd III, the last Sassanid king. These attacks also added all of Iran (except Tabaristan and Gilan) to the territory of the Rashidun Caliphate. Iran conquest was the beginning of a gradual process of conversion of Iranians to Islam which lasted several centuries.

At the time of the conquest, Muslims offered border guards or local rulers several options: either become Muslims and be part of the Muslim Ummah; Or accept the rule of the Muslims and remain free by paying the Jizya and remain in their religion; Or to resist and fight as a last resort, in which case there was a risk of being killed or enslaved. Arabs usually did not interfere in the internal affairs of local people who paid their taxes.

The two main policies in this period were (1) to prevent the Bedouins from harming the agricultural community (2) to cooperate Muslim rulers with the rulers and notables of the conquered areas and the local people not to be disturbed as much as possible. For these reasons, the first group of Muslims did not make attempt to convert Iranians to Islam (according to Lapidus, at the time of the Arab conquest, Islam was considered as an Arab religion and for themselves) and were not interested in disrupting social and administrative order. But over time, they increased their control over the cities.

== Umayyads ==
After Assassination of Ali in Great Mosque of Kufa, his son Hasan ibn Ali attained to the caliphate but later abdicated in favor of Mu'awiya to gain the caliphate, Hasan ibn Ali ceded the caliphate and signed the Hasan–Mu'awiya treaty and the caliphate of Mu'awiya (the founder and first caliph of the Umayyad Caliphate) began. According to Abdolhossein Zarrinkoob, the Umayyad rule can be called nothing but reaction and a return to pre-Islamic Arab culture; Because except for the short period of the caliphate of Umar ibn Abdul Aziz, all the caliphs of this series used violence and hatred towards the Mawali and non-Arabs. The Umayyads believed that only those with pure Arab blood in their veins and roots deserved the rule of the people, and that other races were created to serve the Arabs and to do inferior deeds.

The Umayyads tried to impose the Arabic language on the people under their command. For example, Al-Hajjaj ibn Yusuf, who was dissatisfied with the use of Persian language in administrative tribunals, ordered that the language be replaced by Arabic, which was usually not easy to do and was often violent. The report of violence perpetrated by the Umayyads against Iranian culture is reflected in the writings of thinkers such as Abu Rihan al-Biruni and Abu al-Faraj al-Isfahani. In the report on the forgetting of Khwarezmian language, Al-Biruni says that the Arab army killed all those who could speak Khwarezmian, leaving only those who could not read and write.

These violent policies against the Iranians can be seen in historical sources until the time before the rise of Abbasid Caliphate. For example, the caliph's envoy in Isfahan beheaded every single patron who failed to pay his taxes. Or, for example, historical sources such as The Complete History written by Ali ibn al-Athir have reported that Sa'id ibn al-As killed all the people of Tammisha except for one person in 651 (during the conquest of Gurgan by the Muslims during the Rashidun caliphate).

The Arab domination over the Iranians was getting heavier and heavier, and the meaning of the Arab religion was replaced with the personal intentions and the rule of the dominant ethnic group over the defeated ethnic group and humiliation of the non-Arab people was getting acute and no progress was made for the natives. There were three groups of people at this time:

1. A group that accepted the teachings of Islam with full will and faith and converted to Islam, which were mostly followers of the family of Ali ibn Abi Talib. This group was depressed and dissatisfied with the non-implementation of the laws and teachings of the religion.
1. The other group, who pretended to be Muslims due to evasion of paying Jizya and Kharaj and gaining prestige and comfort, were in fact neither of the previous religion nor of the new religion. These groups were not treated as they wished, the Arabs treated them with arrogance and swagger, and did not give them social privileges as they wanted, and these caused them dissatisfaction.
1. Others remained in the religion of their ancestors. The third group was constantly waiting for the opportunity to get rid of the rulers.

== Abbasids ==
Due to Al-Mutawakkil (the 10th Abbasid caliph) administrative, financial and military policies, including excessive spending, instability of administrative officials and relocation of the capital to Samarra, as well as his religious turn to the Hanbali, the caliphate was weakened and with his assassination by Turk slaves in 861 CE, the ground for the decline of Abbasid power was provided. With the civil war in Baghdad and Samarra over a decade after Al-Mutawakkil's death, which led to the assassination of four caliphs, the Abbasid empire was actually fragmented and relatively independent dynasties emerged by local military powers called "Amir" in various parts of the Islamic lands. These new dynasties, such as the Saffarids, sought autonomy and decentralization, unlike previous rulers such as the Tahirids.

== See also ==
- History of Iran after Islam
- Muslim conquest of Persia
- Ali's Eastern Campaigns
- Islamization of Iran
- Ajam
- Shu'ubiyya
- Rashidun
- Sarbadars
- Chobanids
- Muzaffarids (Iran)
- Kara Koyunlu
- Aq Qoyunlu

== Sources ==
- Hoyland, Robert G. (2015). In God's Path: the Arab Conquests and the Creation of an Islamic Empire. Oxford: Oxford University Press. ISBN 978-0-19-991636-8.
