= Islamization of Iran =

Overview of Iran's shift towards Islam and Islamic culture

The Islamization of Iran began with the Muslim conquest of Iran, when the Rashidun Caliphate annexed the Sasanian Empire. It was a long process by which Islam, though initially rejected, eventually spread among the Persians and the other Iranian peoples. Although Arabization was a common element of the early Muslim conquests, it did not have as significant of an impact in Iran as it did elsewhere, as the Iranian populace persisted in maintaining many of their pre-Islamic traditions, such as their language and culture, albeit with adaptations to conform to the nascent religion. A distinctly Iranian Muslim identity emerged in this context and later sidelined the Arabs in what is known as the Iranian Intermezzo.

Iranian society was deeply transformed by the spread of Islam, which greatly influenced the nation's cultural, scientific, and political structure; the blossoming of Persian literature, philosophy, medicine, and art became major elements of Islam in Iran. Integrating a heritage of thousands of years of civilization and being at the "crossroads of the major cultural highways" in the Near East contributed to the Iranians emerging at the forefront of the Islamic Golden Age under the Abbasid Caliphate.

Between the 7th century and the 16th century, Sunni Islam was dominant among the Iranians, but this changed with the Safavid conversion of Iran to Shia Islam, which marked another historic societal shift for the nation. Consequently, Shia Islam remains dominant in modern-day Iran, where it is the official religion, as well as in Iraq and Azerbaijan.

== History ==
=== Muslim conquest of Iran ===
==== Impact on Arab–Persian relations ====
After the Muslim conquest of Iran, during the 90-year-long reign of the Umayyad dynasty, until the time of Abd al-Malik ibn Marwan, the divan was dominated by the mawali and accounts were written using the Pahlavi script. The controversial Umayyad governor Al-Hajjaj ibn Yusuf forced all the mawali who had left for cities, in order to avoid paying the kharaj tax, to return to their lands. He was upset at the usage of Persian as the court language in the eastern Islamic empire, and ordered that it be changed to Arabic.

There are a number of historians who see the rule of the Umayyads as setting up the "dhimmah" to increase taxes from the dhimmis to benefit the Arab Muslim community financially and by discouraging conversion. Islam, during the Umayyad Caliphate, was initially associated with the ethnic identity of the Arab and required formal association with an Arab tribe and the adoption of the client status of mawali. Governors lodged complaints with the caliph when he enacted laws that made conversion easier, depriving the provinces of revenues. Notable Zoroastrian converts to Islam included Abd-Allāh Ibn al-Muqaffaʿ, Fadl ibn Sahl and Naubakht Ahvazi.

Patrick Clawson states that "The Iranians chafed under Umayyad rule. The Umayyads rose from traditional Arab aristocracy. They tended to marry other Arabs, creating an ethnic stratification that discriminated against Iranians. Even as Arabs adopted traditional Iranian bureaucracy, Arab tribalism disadvantaged Iranians."

The Arab conquerors, according to many historians, formed "a ruling aristocracy with special rights and privileges, which they emphatically did not propose to share with the mawali". Some rulers, such as Hajjaj ibn Yusuf even went as far as viewing the Mawali as "barbarians", implementing harsh policies such as branding to keep the subjects in check.

The case of Hajjaj is particularly noteworthy as many reports have come down to us from his racial policies and iron tactics in governing the provinces. And yet many skeptics point to the fact that some of these reports were written by Abbasid era writers who may have had a skewed view of their predecessors.

However, Hajjaj was not the only case of cruelty against the Mawali. The non-Iranian appointee of the Caliph in Isfahan for example cut off the heads of any of the Mawali who failed to pay their taxes, and Ibn Athir in his al-kāmil reports that Sa'id ibn al-'Ās killed all but one person in the port city of Tamisah, during his incursion to Gorgan in the year 651.

Such tumultuous conditions eventually were responsible for the rise of the Shuubiyah movement, and the rise of Persian nationalist tendencies in the 9th century with the emergence of the Samanids.

==== Islamization and Arabization ====
During the Abbasid period, an enfranchisement was experienced by the mawali and a shift was made in political conception from that of a primarily Arab empire to one of a Muslim empire, and around 930, a requirement was enacted that required all bureaucrats of the empire be Muslim. Both periods were also marked by significant migrations of Arab tribes outwards from the Arabian Peninsula into the newly conquered territories.

Before the Muslim conquest of Iran, the Persian people were predominantly Zoroastrian. The historian al-Masudi, a Baghdad-born Arab, who wrote a comprehensive treatise on history and geography in about 956, records that after the conquest:

Zoroastrianism, for the time being, continued to exist in many parts of Iran. Not only in countries that came relatively late under Muslim sway (e.g Tabaristan) but also in those regions which early had become provinces of the Muslim empire. In almost all the Iranian provinces, according to Al Masudi, fire temples were to be found – the Madjus he says, venerate many fire temples in Iraq, Fars, Kirman, Sistan, Khurasan, Tabaristan, al Djibal, Azerbaijan and Arran.

This general statement of al-Masudi is fully supported by the medieval geographers who make mention of fire temples in most of the Iranian towns.

Also, Islam was readily accepted by Zoroastrians who were employed in industrial and artisan positions because, according to Zoroastrian dogma, such occupations that involved defiling fire made them impure. Moreover, Muslim missionaries did not encounter difficulty in explaining Islamic tenets to Zoroastrians, as there were many similarities between the two faiths. According to Thomas Walker Arnold, for the Persian, he would meet Ahura Mazda and Ahriman under the names of Allah and Iblis. At times, Muslim leaders, in their effort to win converts, encouraged attendance at Muslim prayer with promises of money and allowed the Quran to be recited in Persian instead of Arabic so that it would be intelligible to all. Later, the Samanids, whose roots stemmed from Zoroastrian theocratic nobility, propagated Sunni Islam and Perso-Islamic culture deep into the heart of Central Asia. The first complete translation of the Quran into the Persian language occurred during the reign of the Samanids in the 9th century.

The "conversion curve" by Richard Bulliet highlights a relatively low conversion rate of non-Arab subjects during the Arab-centric Umayyad period, estimated at 10%. In contrast, during the more politically multicultural Abbasid period, the Muslim population increased significantly, from approximately 40% in the mid-9th century to nearly 80% by the end of the 11th century.

The emergence of Iranian Muslim dynasties had a great effect on the changing religion, per Seyyed Hossein Nasr. These dynasties have adopted some Persian cultural values and adapted them with Islam.

==== Shu'ubiyya and Persianization ====
Although Persians adopted the religion of their conquerors, over the centuries they worked to protect and revive their distinctive language and culture, a process known as Persianization. Arabs and Turks participated in this attempt.

In the 9th and 10th centuries, non-Arab subjects of the Ummah created a movement called Shu'ubiyyah in response to the privileged status of Arabs. Most of those behind the movement were Persian, but references to Egyptians and Berbers are attested. Citing as its basis Islamic notions of equality of races and nations, the movement was primarily concerned with preserving Persian culture and protecting Persian identity, though within a Muslim context. It was a response to the growing Arabization of Islam in the earlier centuries. The most notable effect of the movement was the survival of Persian language, the language of the Persians, to the present day.

The Abbasids also held a strong pro-Iranian campaign against the Umayyads in order to get support from the Persian population. After their establishment as Caliphs, holidays such as Nowruz for example were permitted after a decades-long suppression by the Umayyad rulers. The Abbasids, in particular al-Mamun, also actively promoted the Persian language. The Samanid dynasty who defeated the Saffarids, and called themselves descendants of Sassanid Eran spahbod Bahram Chobin.

However, after the reign of the Umayyads and Abbasids, Iran and its society in particular experienced reigning dynasties who legitimized Persian languages and customs, while still encouraging Islam. Moreover, there was close interaction between Persian and Arab leaders, particularly during the wake of the Samanids who promoted revived Persian more than the Buyids and the Saffarids, while continuing to patronize Arabic to a significant degree.

The Samanid dynasty was the first fully native dynasty to rule Iran since the Muslim conquest and led the revival of Persian culture. The first important Persian poet after the arrival of Islam, Rudaki, was born during this era and was praised by Samanid kings. The Samanids also revived many ancient Persian festivals. Their successor, the Ghaznawids, who were of non-Iranian origin, also became instrumental in the revival of Persian.

The Shi'a Buyid rulers, adopted a similar attitude in this regard. They tried to revive many of the Sassanid customs and traditions. They even adopted the ancient Persian title of Shahanshah (King of Kings) for their rulers.

After the rise of the Safavid dynasty, Twelver Shia Islam became the official state religion and its adoption imposed upon the majority of the Iranian population.

== Iranian influence on Islamic culture ==
According to Bernard Lewis:

"Iran was indeed Islamized, but it was not Arabized. Persians remained Persians. And after an interval of silence, Iran re-emerged as a separate, different and distinctive element within Islam, eventually adding a new element even to Islam itself. Culturally, politically, and most remarkable of all even religiously, the Iranian contribution to this new Islamic civilization is of immense importance. The work of Iranians can be seen in every field of cultural endeavor, including Arabic poetry, to which poets of Iranian origin composing their poems in Arabic made a very significant contribution. In a sense, Iranian Islam is a second advent of Islam itself, a new Islam sometimes referred to as Islam-i Ajam. It was this Persian Islam, rather than the original Arab Islam, that was brought to new areas and new peoples: to the Turks, first in Central Asia and then in the Middle East in the country which came to be called Turkey, and of course to India. The Ottoman Turks brought a form of Iranian civilization to the walls of Vienna."

The Persians had a great influence on their Arab conquerors. The caliphs adopted many administrative practices of the Sasanian Empire, such as coinage, the office of vizier, or minister, and the divan, a bureaucracy for collecting taxes and giving state stipends. Indeed, Persians themselves largely became the administrators. It is well established that the Abbasid caliphs modeled their administration on that of the Sasanians. The caliphs adopted Sasanian court dress and ceremony. In terms of architecture Islamic architecture borrowed heavily from Persian architecture. Sasanian architecture had a distinctive influence over Islamic architecture.

Iranians, since the beginning had interest and sincere efforts in compiling the study of Arabic etymology, grammar, syntax, morphology, figures of speech, rules of eloquence, and rhetoric. Arabic was not seen as an alien language but the language of Islam and thereby Arabic was widely accepted as an academic and religious language and embraced in many parts of Iran. It was for the sake of the Quran and Islam that books of philosophy, mysticism, history, medicine, mathematics, and law had been written or translated into this language.

Persians also contributed greatly to Arabic learning and literature. The influence of the Academy of Gundishapur is particularly worthy of note.

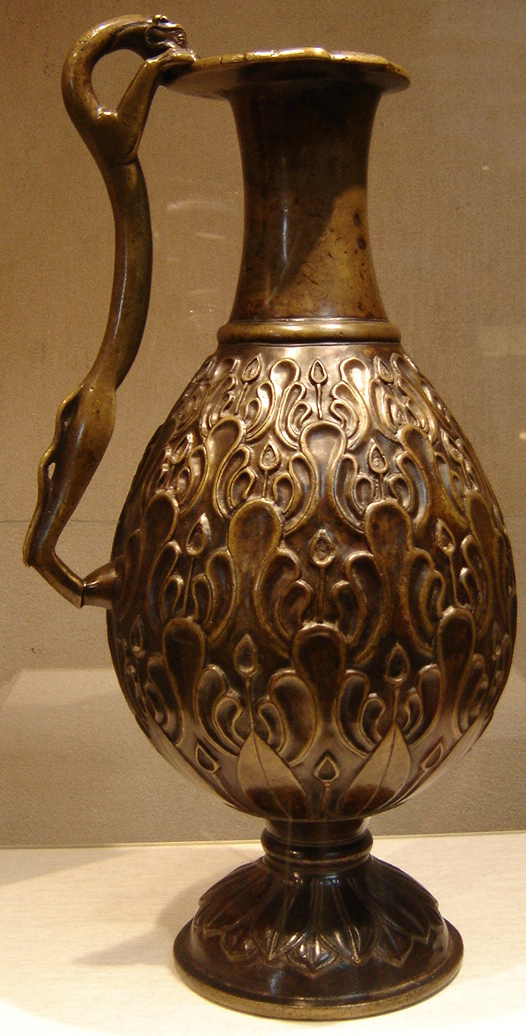
Early Islamic era Iranian art: Ewer from 7th century Persia. Cast chased and inlaid bronze. New York Metropolitan Museum of Art.

The New Persian language written in the Arabic alphabet with some modifications was formed in the late ninth century in eastern Iran and came to flourish in Bukhara, the capital of the Persian Samanid dynasty.

Persian language, because of its strong support from later Abbasid rulers condoning the language became one of the universal Islamic languages, next to Arabic.

The most important scholars of almost all of the Islamic sects and schools of thought were Persian or live in Iran including most notable and reliable Hadith collectors of Shia and Sunni like Shaikh Saduq, Shaikh Kulainy, Imam Bukhari, Imam Muslim and Hakim al-Nishaburi, the greatest theologians of Shia and Sunni like Shaykh Tusi, Imam Ghazali, Imam Fakhr al-Razi and Al-Zamakhshari, the greatest physicians, astronomers, logicians, mathematicians, metaphysicians, philosophers and scientists like Al-Farabi, Avicenna, and Nasīr al-Dīn al-Tūsī, the greatest Shaykh of Sufism like Rumi, and Abdul-Qadir Gilani.

In 1377, the Arab sociologist, Ibn Khaldun, narrates in his Muqaddimah:

"It is a remarkable fact that, with few exceptions, most Muslim scholars ... in the intellectual sciences have been non-Arabs, thus the founders of grammar were Sibawaih and after him, al-Farsi and Az-Zajjaj. All of them were of Persian descent they invented rules of (Arabic) grammar. Great jurists were Persians. Only the Persians engaged in the task of preserving knowledge and writing systematic scholarly works. Thus the truth of the statement of the prophet (Muhammad) becomes apparent, 'If learning were suspended in the highest parts of heaven the Persians would attain it "... The intellectual sciences were also the preserve of the Persians, left alone by the Arabs, who did not cultivate them...as was the case with all crafts. ... This situation continued in the cities as long as the Persians and Persian countries, Iraq, Khorasan, and Transoxiana (modern Central Asia), retained their sedentary culture."

One Abbasid Caliph is even quoted as saying:

"The Persians ruled for a thousand years and did not need us Arabs even for a day. We have been ruling them for one or two centuries and cannot do without them for an hour."

== See also ==
- Islamic fundamentalism in Iran
- Islamization
- Islamic conquest of Persia
- History of Iran
- Barmakids
- Anti-Persianism by Arabs
- Islamic Cultural Revolution
- Spread of Islam
- Muslim conquests
- Mardavij
- History of Iran after Islam
- Iran during the Caliphate
