= Pachian =

Village in Qom province, Iran

Pachian Persian: پاچيان
- Village
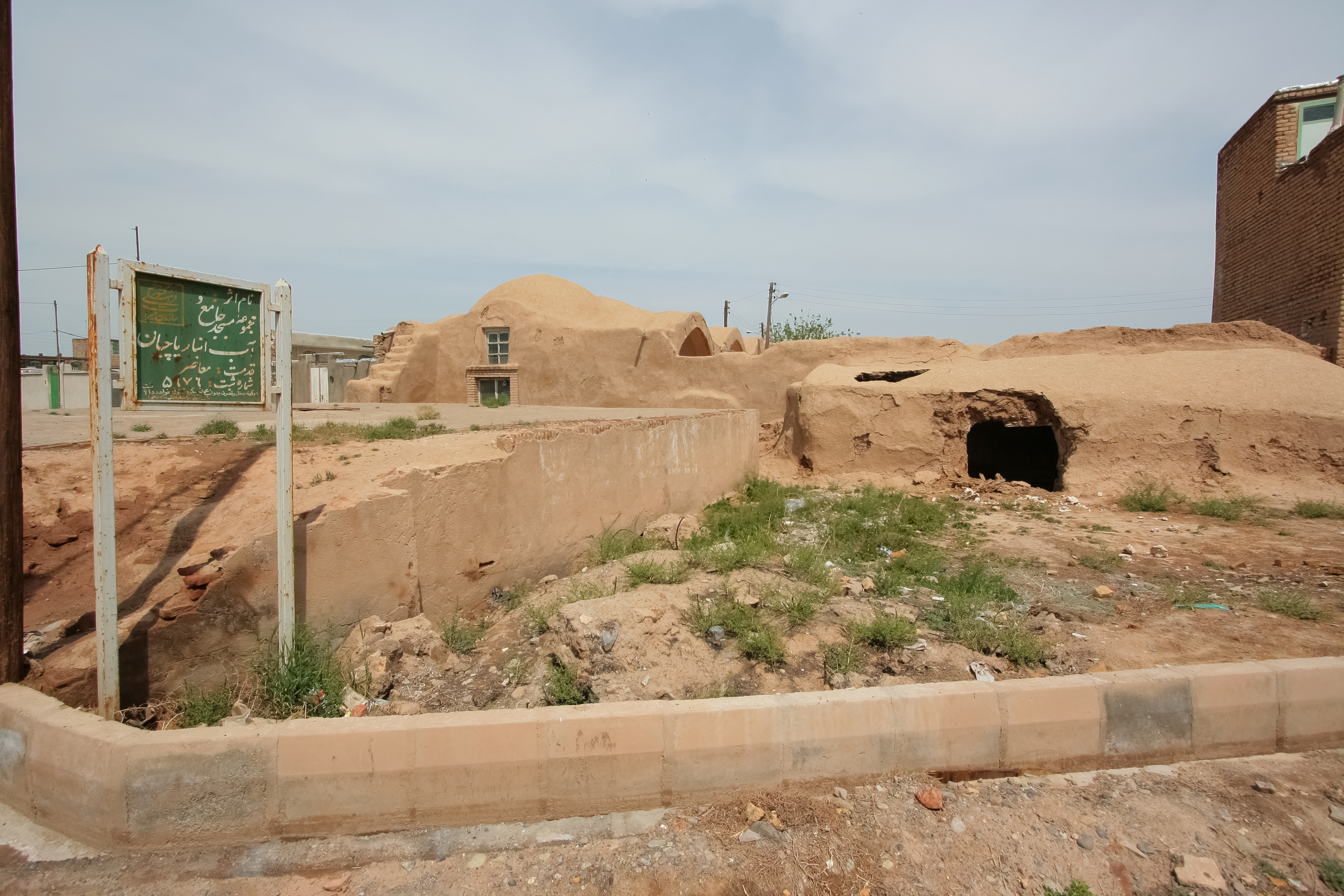
- Jameh Mosque in the village of Pachian

- Location within Iran
- Coordinates: 34°48′05″N 50°34′42″E
- Country: Iran
- Province: Qom
- County: Jafarabad
- District: Central
- Rural District: Jafarabad

Population (2016)
  - Total: 385
- Time zone: UTC+3:30 (IRST)

Pachian (Persian: پاچيان) (Note: Also romanized as Pāchīān and Pāchīyān; also known as Pājeyān) is a village in Jafarabad Rural District of the Central District (Note: Formerly Jafarabad District of Qom County) in Jafarabad County, Qom province, Iran.

== Demographics ==
=== Population ===
At the time of the 2006 National Census, the village's population was 351 in 88 households, when it was in Jafarabad District (Note: Renamed the Central District of Jafarabad County) of Qom County. The following census in 2011 counted 436 people in 130 households. The 2016 census measured the population of the village as 385 people in 119 households.

In 2021, the district was separated from the county in the establishment of Jafarabad County and renamed the Central District.
