= Islam in Iran =

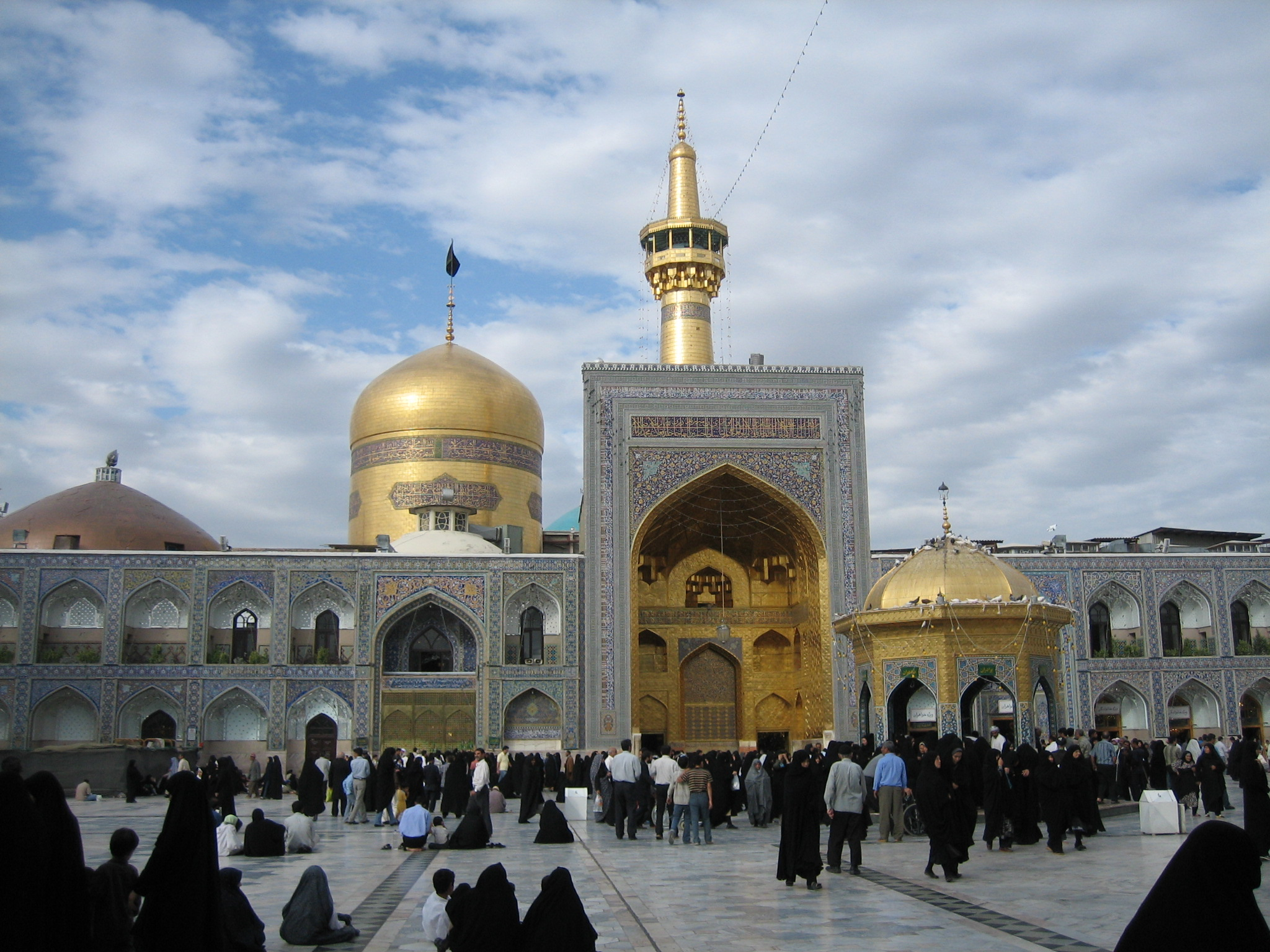
- Reza Shrine

Total population
- ▲87,520,000

Regions with significant populations
- Tehran

Religions
- Shia Islam Sunni Islam

Languages
- Persian

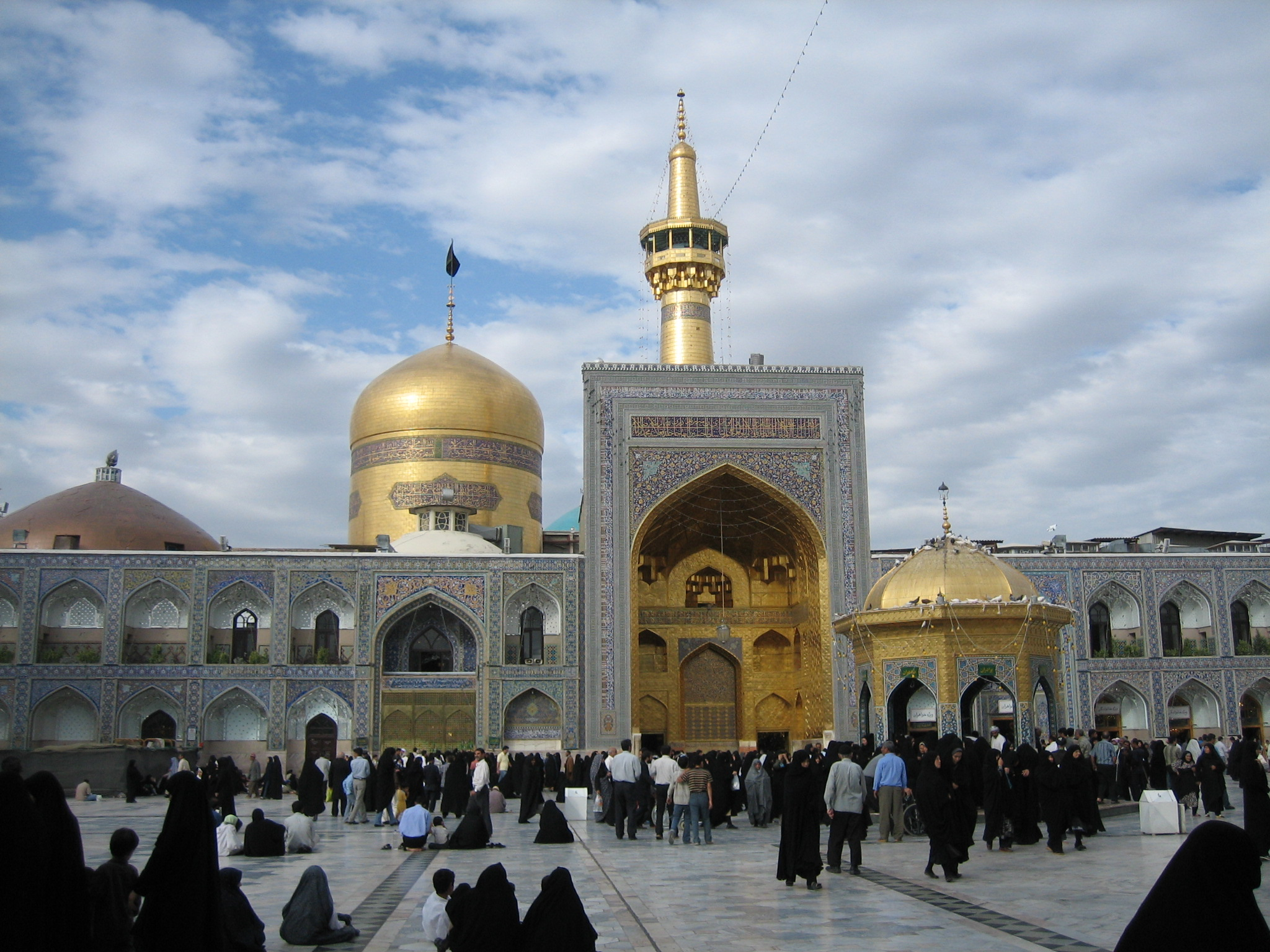
Imam Reza shrine, the holiest religious site in Iran, Mashhad

The Twelver Shi'a Islam is the official religion of Iran. Islam was introduced after the Arab conquest of Iran in the 7th century, which led to the fall of the Sasanian Empire and the gradual conversion of the Iranian population over next several centuries. By the 10th century, most Persians had become Muslims, and Iranian dynasties and scholars played a major role in the development of Islamic civilization during the Islamic Golden Age.

Between the 7th and 15th centuries, Sunni Islam was the dominant sect in Iran. In the early 16th century, the Safavid dynasty established Twelver Shi'a Islam as the state religion through state-sponsored conversion campaigns, transforming Iran into a predominantly Shi'a country. Over the following centuries, Shi'a Islam became closely intertwined with the Iranian identity and political culture.

Since the Iranian Revolution of 1979, Iran has been governed as an Islamic republic based on the doctrine of Guardianship of the Islamic Jurist (velayat-e faqih), with Shi'a Islam and the Ja'fari school designated as the official religion and basis of the legal system. Iran is today a predominantly Shi'a Muslim country, with Sunni Muslim minorities and smaller non-Muslim communities.

Shia and Sunni Islam in Iran (Note: Statistics from the CIA. Actual values reported by the 2011 source are Shia, 90-95% and Sunni, 5-10%. Later reports from the same site do not report this breakdown. The two sources indicate the total percentage of all Muslims to have been [i] 99.4% (2011 estimate, the remaining 0.6% being other religious groups—including 0.3% Zoroastrian, Jewish, or Christian, and 0.4% unspecified), or 98.5% (2020 estimate, the remaining 1.5% being other religious groups—including 0.7% Christian, 0.3% Baha'i, combined numbers for Zoroastrian, Jewish, and Hindu adherents totaling 0.2%, and agnostics at 0.3%, in both cases, numbers not summing to 100% because of rounding).)
1. Shia Islam (92.5%)
2. Sunni Islam (7.50%)

== Western estimates of adherence ==
According to an October 2024 update to Britannica.com by scholars at the universities of Cambridge and Utah, as of the date of their source data, Muslims accounted for 99.6% of the total population of Iran and comparable older numbers and somewhat discrepant more recent numbers, at CIA.gov—with the "vast majority... [stated as being] of the Ithnā ʿAsharī, or Twelver, Shiʿi branch".

The Iranian government's 2016 census purportedly presents 99% of the Iranian population as Muslim, and 80% of this figure is composed of Twelver Shi'as. Approximately 7% of Iranians are Sunnis. According to scholars at the universities of Cambridge and Utah, the country's "Kurds and Turkmen are predominantly Sunni Muslims", with Iran's Arab population being split between "Sunni and Shiʿi" (Shia). Other sources note that this smaller percentage comprises the country's ethnic minorities, the Kurds, Turkmens, and Arabs, as well as Achomi Persians, Khorasani Persians, and Baloch.

According to the 2020 Wave 7 World Values Survey, 96.6% of Iranians identify as Muslims.

=== GAMAAN surveys ===
However, a report by the Group for Analyzing and Measuring Attitudes in Iran (GAMAAN) in the same year showed a sharp decline in religiosity in the country, as only 40% of Iranian respondents identified as Muslims. Subsequent GAMAAN surveys in 2022 showed that, 38% to 56% identified as Shia Muslims, 5% identified as Sunni Muslims, and roughly a quarter of were susceptible to a form of deism—that is, belief in God without identifying as religious. In all GAMAAN surveys, 7% to 10% of Iranian respondents identified as atheists.

However, even for opponents of the Islamic Republic the GAMAAN surveys have been the object methodological criticisms, including online and snowball-sampling surveys, focus on the use of non-probability, self-selected samples recruited through social media, which critics argue introduce systematic bias and limit representativeness. Weighting procedures are considered insufficient to correct for these structural sampling biases. Additional concerns include coverage error stemming from unequal internet access, disproportionately excluding rural, elderly, and lower-income populations, as well as limited transparency regarding raw data, recruitment methods, and protections against duplicate or automated responses, which constrains independent verification and replicability.

== History ==
=== Arab conquest of Iran ===
Stages of Islamic conquest Expansion under Muhammad, 622-632 Expansion during the Rashidun Caliphate, 632-661 Expansion during the Umayyad Caliphate, 661-750

Arab Muslims conquered Iran in the time of Umar (637) and conquered it after several great battles. Yazdegerd III fled from one district to another Merv in 651. By 674, Arab Muslims had conquered Greater Khorasan (which included modern Iranian Khorasan province and modern Afghanistan, Transoxania).

As Bernard Lewis has quoted

"These events have been variously seen in Iran: by some as a blessing, the advent of the true faith, the end of the age of ignorance and heathenism; by others as a humiliating national defeat, the conquest and subjugation of the country by foreign invaders. Both perceptions are of course valid, depending on one's angle of vision."

Under Umar and his immediate successors, the Arab conquerors attempted to maintain their political and cultural cohesion despite the attractions of the civilizations they had conquered. The Arabs were to settle in the garrison towns rather than on scattered estates. The new non-Muslim subjects, or dhimmi, were to pay a special tax, the jizya or poll tax, which was calculated per individual at varying rates for able bodied men of military age.

Iranians were among the very earliest converts to Islam, and their conversion in significant numbers began as soon as the Arab armies reached and overran the Persian plateau. Despite some resistance from elements of the Zoroastrian clergy and other ancient religions, the anti-Islamic policies of later conquerors like the Il-khanids, the impact of the Christian and secular West in modern times, and the attraction of new religious movements like Babism and the Baháʼí Faith (qq.v.), the vast majority of Iranians became and have remained Muslims. Today perhaps 98 percent of ethnic Iranians, including the population of Persia, are at least nominal Muslims. For such a fundamental, pervasive, and enduring cultural transformation, the phenomenon of Iranian conversions to Islam has received remarkably little scholarly attention.

Recent research has established a general chronological framework for the process of conversion of Iranians to Islam. From a study of the probable dates of individual conversions based on genealogies in biographical dictionaries, Richard Bulliet has suggested that there was gradual and limited conversion of Persians down to the end of the Umayyad period (132/750), followed by a rapid increase in the number of conversions after the ʿAbbasid revolution, so that by the time when regional dynasties had been established in the east (ca. 338/950) 80 percent or more of Iranians had become Muslims. The data on which Bulliet's study was based limited the validity of this paradigm to generalizations about full, formal conversions in an urban environment. The situation in rural areas and individual regions may have been quite different, but the overall pattern is consistent with what can be deduced from traditional historical sources. Although in some areas, for example, Shiraz at the time of Moqaddasi's visit in about 375/985 (p. 429), there may still have been strong non-Muslim elements, it is reasonable to suppose that the Persian milieu as a whole became predominantly Islamic within the period of time suggested by Bulliet's research.

==== Islamization of Iran ====
Following the Abbasid revolution of 749–51, in which Iranian converts played a major role, the Caliphate's center of gravity moved to Mesopotamia and underwent significant Iranian influences. Accordingly, the Muslim population of Iran rose from approx. 40% in the mid 9th century to close to 100% by the end of the 11th century. Islam was readily accepted by Zoroastrians who were employed in industrial and artisan positions because, according to Zoroastrian dogma, such occupations that involved defiling fire made them impure. Moreover, Muslim missionaries did not encounter difficulty in explaining Islamic tenets to Zoroastrians, as there were many similarities between the faiths. According to Thomas Walker Arnold, for the Persian, he would meet Ahura Mazda and Ahriman under the names of Allah and Iblis. Muslim leaders in their effort to win converts encouraged attendance at Muslim prayer, and allowed the Quran to be recited in Persian instead of Arabic so that it would be intelligible to all. The first complete translation of the Qur'an into Persian occurred during the reign of Samanids in the 9th century. Seyyed Hossein Nasr suggests that the rapid increase in conversion was aided by the Persian nationality of the rulers.

According to Bernard Lewis:

"Iran was indeed Islamized, but it was not Arabized. Persians remained Persians. And after an interval of silence, Iran reemerged as a separate, different and distinctive element within Islam, eventually adding a new element even to Islam itself. Culturally, politically, and most remarkable of all even religiously, the Iranian contribution to this new Islamic civilization is of immense importance. The work of Iranians can be seen in every field of cultural endeavor, including Arabic poetry, to which poets of Iranian origin composing their poems in Arabic made a very significant contribution. In a sense, Iranian Islam is a second advent of Islam itself, a new Islam sometimes referred to as Islam-i Ajam. It was this Persian Islam, rather than the original Arab Islam, that was brought to new areas and new peoples: to the Turks, first in Central Asia and then in the Middle East in the country which came to be called Turkey, and India. The Ottoman Turks brought a form of Iranian civilization to the walls of Vienna..."

=== Iranian influence on Muslim civilization ===
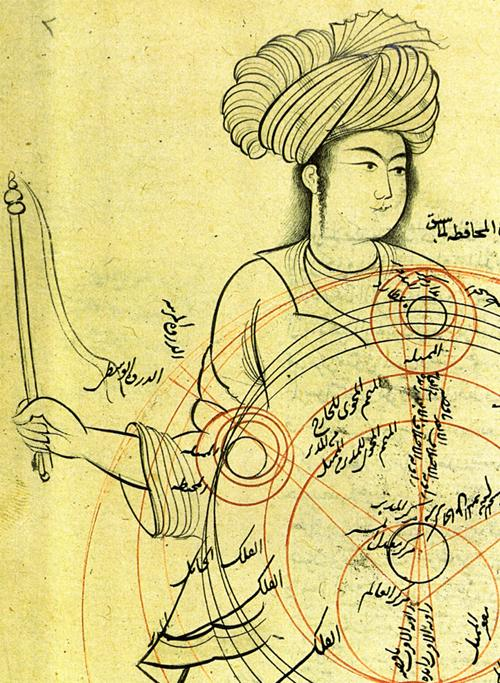
Photo taken from medieval manuscript by Qotbeddin Shirazi (1236–1311), a Persian Astronomer. The image depicts an epicyclic planetary model.

The Islamization of Iran was to yield deep transformations within the cultural, scientific, and political structure of Iran's society: The blossoming of Persian literature, philosophy, medicine and art became major elements of the newly forming Muslim civilization. Inheriting a heritage of thousands of years of civilization, and being at the "crossroads of the major cultural highways", contributed to Persia emerging as what culminated into the "Islamic Golden Age". During this period, hundreds of scholars and scientists vastly contributed to technology, science and medicine, later influencing the rise of European science during the Renaissance.

Iran was home to many of the most prominent figures of Islamic thought across both Shia and Sunni branches, including Hadith collectors like Shaikh Saduq, Shaikh Kulainy, Imam Bukhari, Imam Muslim and Hakim al-Nishaburi and theologians like Shaykh Tusi, Imam Ghazali, Imam Fakhr al-Razi and Al-Zamakhshari. Prominent Islamic physicians, astronomers, logicians, mathematicians, metaphysicians, philosophers and scientists like Al-Farabi, Avicenna, and Nasīr al-Dīn al-Tūsī were Iranian or lived in Persia. Iranians also played a prominent role in the development of Sufism, with notable Shaykhs like Rumi and Abdul-Qadir Gilani residing in Iran.

Ibn Khaldun narrates in his Muqaddimah:

It is a remarkable fact that, with few exceptions, most Muslim scholars… in the intellectual sciences have been non-Arabs, thus the founders of grammar were Sibawaih and after him, al-Farsi and Az-Zajjaj. All of them were of Persian descent... they invented rules of (Arabic) grammar. Great jurists were Persians. Only the Persians engaged in the task of preserving knowledge and writing systematic scholarly works. Thus the truth of the statement of the prophet (Muhammad) becomes apparent, "If learning were suspended in the highest parts of heaven the Persians would attain it"… The intellectual sciences were also the preserve of the Persians, left alone by the Arabs, who did not cultivate them… as was the case with all crafts… This situation continued in the cities as long as the Persians and Persian countries, Iraq, Khorasan and Transoxiana (modern Central Asia), retained their sedentary culture.

==== Persian vs. Arabic ====
In the 9th and 10th centuries, non-Arab subjects of the Ummah, especially Persians created a movement called Shu'ubiyya in response to the privileged status of Arabs. This movement led to resurgence of Persian national identity. Although Persians adopted Islam, over the centuries they worked to protect and revive their distinctive language and culture, a process known as Persianization. Arabs and Turks also participated in this attempt.

As the power of the Abbasid caliphs diminished, a series of dynasties rose in various parts of Iran, some with considerable influence and power. Among the most important of these overlapping dynasties were the Tahirids in Khorasan (820–72); the Saffarids in Sistan (867–903); and the Samanids (875–1005), originally at Bokhara. The Samanids eventually ruled an area from central Iran to Pakistan. By the early 10th century, the Abbasids almost lost control to the growing Persian faction known as the Buwayhid dynasty (934–1055). Since much of the Abbasid administration had been Persian anyway, the Buwayhid, who were Zaidi Shia, were quietly able to assume real power in Baghdad.

The Samanid dynasty was the first fully native dynasty to rule Iran since the Muslim conquest, and led the revival of Persian culture. The first important Persian poet after the arrival of Islam, Rudaki, was born during this era and was praised by Samanid kings. The Samanids also revived many ancient Persian festivals. Their successor, the Ghaznawids, who were of non-Iranian Turkic origin, also became instrumental in the revival of Persian.

=== Sunni dynasties in Iran ===
In 962 a Turkish governor of the Samanids, Alptigin, conquered Ghazna (in present-day Afghanistan) and established a dynasty, the Ghaznavids, that lasted to 1186. Later, the Seljuks, who like the Ghaznavids were Turks, slowly conquered Iran over the course of the 11th century. Their leader, Tughril Beg, turned his warriors against the Ghaznavids in Khorasan. He moved south and then west, conquering but not wasting the cities in his path. In 1055 the caliph in Baghdad gave Tughril Beg robes, gifts, and the title King of the East. Under Tughril Beg's successor, Malik Shah (1072–1092), Iran enjoyed a cultural and scientific renaissance, largely attributed to his brilliant Iranian vizier, Nizam al Mulk. These leaders established the Isfahan Observatory where Omar Khayyám did much of his experimentation for a new calendar, and they built religious schools in all the major towns. They brought Abu Hamid Ghazali, one of the greatest Islamic theologians, and other eminent scholars to the Seljuk capital at Baghdad and encouraged and supported their work.

A serious internal threat to the Seljuks during their reign came from the Hashshashin- Ismailis of the Nizari sect, with headquarters at Alamut between Rasht and Tehran. They controlled the immediate area for more than 150 years and sporadically sent out adherents to strengthen their rule by murdering important officials. Several of the various theories on the etymology of the word assassin derive from this group.

Another notable Sunni dynasty were the Timurids. Timur was a Turco-Mongol leader from the Eurasian Steppe, who conquered and ruled in the tradition of Genghis Khan. Under the Timurid Empire, the Turco-Persian tradition which began during the Abbasid period would continue. Ulugh Beg, grandson of Timur, built an observatory of his own, and a grand madrassah at Samarkand.

=== Shia dynasties in Iran ===
Although Shi'as have lived in Iran since the earliest days of Islam, the writers of the Four Books of Shi'a ahadith were Iranians of the pre-Safavid era and there was one Shi'a dynasty in part of Iran during the tenth and eleventh centuries, according to Mortaza Motahhari the majority of Iranian scholars and masses remained Sunni till the time of the Safavids.

The domination of the Sunni creed during the first nine Islamic centuries characterizes the religious history of Iran during this period. There were however some exceptions to this general domination which emerged in the form of the Zaydīs of Tabaristan, the Buwayhid, the rule of Sultan Muhammad Khudabandah (r. Shawwal 703-Shawwal 716/1304-1316) and the Sarbedaran. Nevertheless, apart from this domination there existed, firstly, throughout these nine centuries, Shia inclinations among many Sunnis of this land and, secondly, original Imami Shiism as well as Zaydī Shiism had prevalence in some parts of Iran. During this period, Shia in Iran were nourished from Kufah, Baghdad and later from Najaf and Hillah.

However, during the first nine centuries there are four high points in the history of this linkage:

- First, the migration of a number of persons belonging to the tribe of the Ash'ari from Iraq to the city of Qum towards the end of the first/seventh century, which is the period of establishment of Imamī Shī‘ism in Iran.
- Second, the influence of the Shī‘ī tradition of Baghdad and Najaf on Iran during the fifth/eleventh and sixth/twelfth centuries.
- Third, the influence of the school of Hillah on Iran during the eighth/fourteenth century.
- Fourth, the influence of the Shī‘ism of Jabal Amel and Bahrain on Iran during the period of establishment of the Safavid rule.

=== Safavid conversion of Iran to Shia Islam ===
Due to their history being almost fully intertwined, Iran as well as Azerbaijan are both discussed here. Iran and Azerbaijan were predominantly Sunni until the 16th century. Changes in the religious make-up of nowadays both nations changed drastically from that time and on. In 1500 the Safavid Shah Ismail I undertook the conquering of Iran and Azerbaijan and commenced a policy of forced conversion of Sunni Muslims to Shia Islam. Many Sunnis were murdered. When Shah Ismail I conquered Iraq, Dagestan, Eastern Anatolia, and Armenia he similarly forcefully converted or murdered Sunni Muslims. The oppression and forced conversion of Sunnis would continue, mostly unabated, for the greater part of next two centuries until Iran as well as what is now Azerbaijan became predominantly Shi’ite countries.

As in the case of the early caliphate, Safavid rule had been based originally on both political and religious legitimacy, with the shah being both king and divine representative. With the later erosion of Safavid central political authority in the mid-17th century, the power of the Shia scholars in civil affairs such as judges, administrators, and court functionaries, began to grow, in a way unprecedented in Shi'ite history. Likewise, the ulama began to take a more active role in agitating against Sufism and other forms of popular religion, which remained strong in Iran, and in enforcing a more scholarly type of Shi'a Islam among the masses. The development of the ta'ziah—a passion play commemorating the martyrdom of Imam Husayn and his family — and Ziarat of the shrines and tombs of local Shi'ite leaders began during this period, largely at the prompting of the Shi'ite clergy. According to Mortaza Motahhari, the majority of Iranians turned to Shi'a Islam from the Safavid period onwards. Of course, it cannot be denied that Iran's environment was more favorable to the flourishing of the Shi'a Islam as compared to all other parts of the Muslim world. Shi'a Islam did not penetrate any land to the extent that it gradually could in Iran. With the passage of time, Iranians' readiness to practise Shi'a Islam grew day by day. It was the Safavids who made Iran the spiritual bastion of Shi’ism against the onslaughts of shi'as' by orthodox Sunni Islam, and the repository of Persian cultural traditions and self-awareness of Iranianhood, acting as a bridge to modern Iran. According to Professor Roger Savory:

In Number of ways the Safavids affected the development of the modern Iranian state: first, they ensured the continuance of various ancient and traditional Persian institutions, and transmitted these in a strengthened, or more 'national', form; second, by imposing Ithna 'Ashari Shi'a Islam on Iran as the official religion of the Safavid state, they enhanced the power of mujtahids. The Safavids thus set in train a struggle for power between the urban and the crown that is to say, between the proponents of secular government and the proponents of a theocratic government; third, they laid the foundation of alliance between the religious classes ('Ulama') and the bazaar which played an important role both in the Persian Constitutional Revolution of 1905–1906, and again in the Islamic Revolution of 1979; fourth the policies introduced by Shah Abbas I conduced to a more centralized administrative system.

=== Contemporary era: challenges of modernity and rise of Islamism ===
During the 20th century Iran underwent significant changes such as the 1906 Constitutional Revolution and the secularism of the Pahlavi dynasty.

According to scholar Roy Mottahedeh, one significant change to Islam in Iran during the first half of the 20th century was that the class of ulema lost its informality that allowed it to include everyone from the highly trained jurist to the "shopkeeper who spent one afternoon a week memorizing and transmitting a few traditions." Laws by Reza Shah that requiring military service and dress in European-style clothes for Iranians, gave talebeh and mullahs exemptions, but only if they passed specific examinations proving their learnedness, thus excluding less educated clerics.

In addition Islamic Madrasah schools became more like 'professional' schools, leaving broader education to secular government schools and sticking to Islamic learning. "Ptolemaic astronomy, Avicennian medicines, and the algebra of Omar Khayyam" was dispensed with.

==== Deobandi movement ====
Darul Uloom Deoband was established in 1866 in the Saharanpur district of Uttar Pradesh, India, as part of the anti-British movement. It gave rise to a traditional conservative Sunni movement known as the Deobandi movement. Students from various regions, including Sistan and Baluchestan in Iran, attended Deoband, which led to the spread of its founders ideas. This movement had a significant impact on some of the new generation of Iranian intellectuals in the late 19th and early 20th centuries. After entering Iran, the students of this school continued to expand this thinking and with the formation of missionary groups. These thoughts have been strengthened on one hand due to the cultural relationships between the Baloch tribes and on the other hand due to the connection of Sistan and Baluchestan's Iran and India's Hanafi religious leaders in Iran. Today, Deobandi thinking is one of the intellectual currents in Sistan and Baluchestan and preaching groups are active in different cities and villages. Its playing a crucial role in Iran's political landscape. The Deobandis aimed to homogenize religious schools and were opposed to certain popular practices. The Naqshbandi order played an important role in the Deobandi school of thought in the Persian-speaking world.

==== Islamic Revolution ====
The Iranian Revolution (also known as the Islamic Revolution, Persian: انقلاب اسلامی, Enghelābe Eslāmi) was the revolution that transformed Iran from a secular, westernizing monarchy under Shah Mohammad Reza Pahlavi, to an Islamic republic based on the doctrine of Velayat-e faqih (rule by an Islamic jurist), under Ayatollah Ruhollah Khomeini, the leader of the revolution and founder of the Islamic Republic. It has been called "the third great revolution in history", following the French and Russian Revolutions, and an event that "made Islamic fundamentalism a political force ... from Morocco to Malaysia."

== Modern Iranian Islam ==
=== The Islamic Republic ===
Iran's government was, until recently, unique in having Shi'i Islam as the state religion. It still is unique in following the theocratic principle of velayat-e faqih or "Guardianship of the Islamic jurist", according to which government must be run in accordance with traditional Islamic sharia, and for this to happen a leading Islamic jurist (faqih) must provide political "guardianship" (wilayat or velayat) over the people. Following the Iranian Revolution, the 1979 Constitution of Islamic Republic of Iran called for a "guardian" to be the Supreme Leader of Iran, and Ayatollah Ruhollah Khomeini, the leader of the revolution and author of the doctrine of Velayat-e faqih, became the first Supreme Leader of the Islamic Republic.

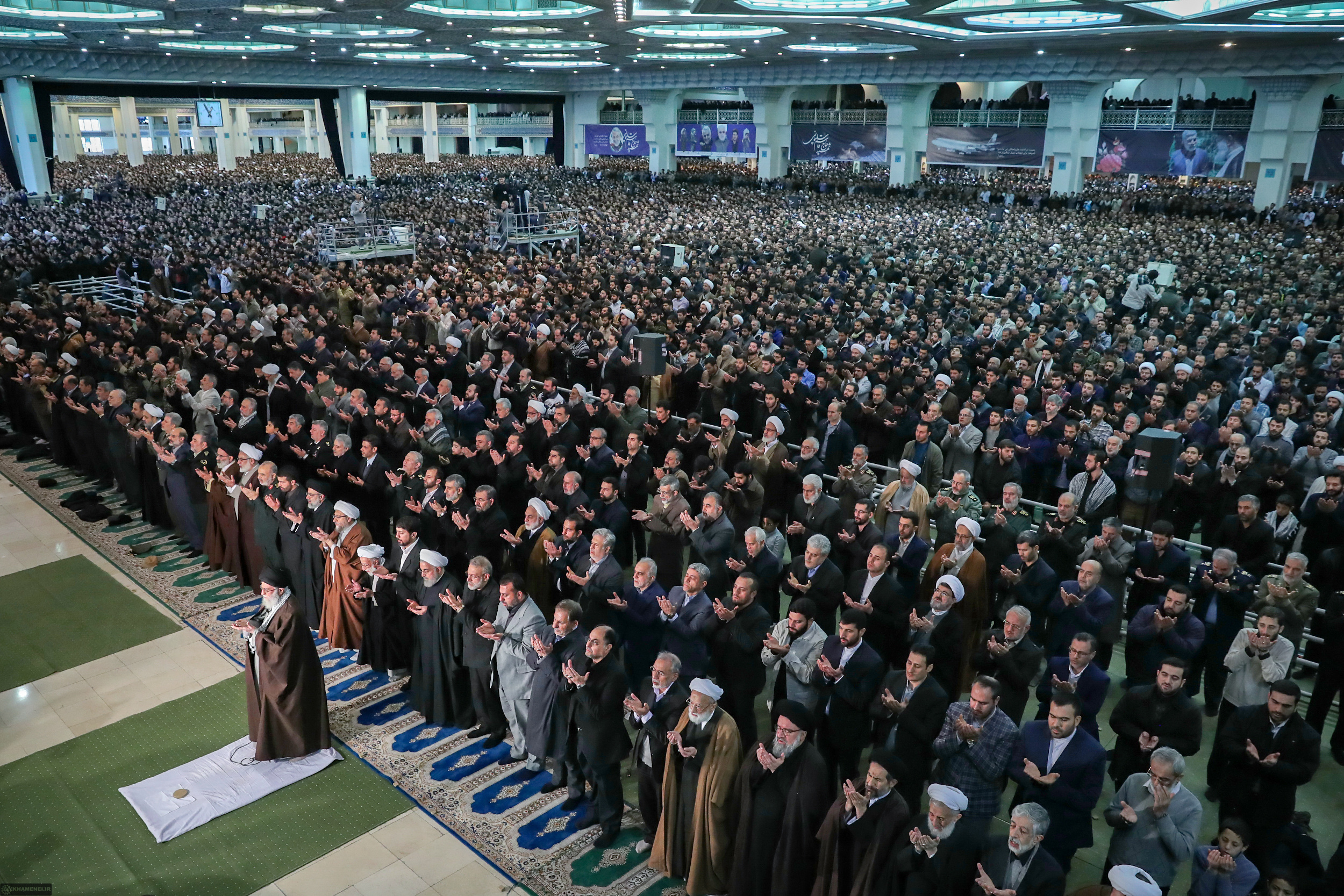
Ayatollah Ali Khamenei leading Friday prayers in Tehran, 17 January 2020

The Constitution of the Islamic Republic of Iran mandates that the official religion of Iran is Shia Islam and the Twelver Ja'fari school, though it also mandates that other Islamic schools are to be "accorded full respect", and their followers are free to act in accordance with their own jurisprudence in performing their religious rites. According to the constitution, high level officials such as the Supreme Leader, president, and members of the powerful Assembly of Experts that chooses the leader must be Twelver Shia.

It lists Zoroastrian, Jewish, and Christian Iranians as "the only recognized religious minorities, who, within the limits of the law, are free to perform their religious rites and ceremonies, and to act according to their own canon in matters of personal affairs and religious education." Consequently, to avail oneself of many of the rights of citizenship in the Islamic Republic of Iran, one must declare oneself as a member of one of the four recognized faiths—Muslims, Zoroastrians, Jews and Christians. This official division ignores other religious minorities in Iran, notably those of the Baháʼí Faith. State sanctioned persecution of Bahá’ís follows from them being a "non-recognized" religious minority without any legal existence, classified as "unprotected infidels" by the authorities, and are subject to systematic discrimination on the basis of their beliefs. Similarly, atheism is officially disallowed.

==== Surveys and polls ====
One unanticipated effect of theocratic rule in Iran is that in the last couple of decades up to at least 2018, not only have secular people become alienated from the regime, but

the state has lost much of its religious credibility among the ultra-religious communities because of widespread corruption, discrimination and its secularisation. Thus, many ultra-religious people deny the Islamic legitimacy of the government in toto and embrace this or that alternative religiosity ...

An example of one kind of religious alternative are figures (such as Ahmad al-Hassan), claiming to be deputies of the Hidden Imam.

Survey data from Tehran indicate that religiosity has remained high over time, although with some variation in intensity. In the 2008 Tehran survey, 58.8% of respondents described religion as very important or important, while an additional 27.6% considered it rather important. Together, this meant that 86.4% of respondents attached at least some importance to religion, compared with 13.5% who regarded it as not very important (11.2%) or not at all important (2.3%). In the 2009 survey, the share describing religion as very important or important remained similarly high at 58.5%, with 21.3% saying it was rather important. This placed the combined proportion assigning importance to religion at 79.8%, while 15.5% viewed it as not very important (5.5%) or not at all important (10%). By 2016, although the proportion identifying religion as very important or important declined to 53.5%, a further 31.1% still considered it rather important. As a result, 84.6% of respondents continued to report that religion held some degree of importance in their lives, compared with 15.3% who rated it as not very important (10.5%) or not at all important (4.8%).

In July 2018, following the protests, University of Maryland's School of Public Policy released a report, Iranian Public Opinion after the Protests, and when the respondents were asked if "Iran's political system needs to undergo fundamental change" the researchers noted that "over three in four disagreed (77%) with a majority doing so strongly (54%)" with only 5% "agreeing strongly". They further found out that "a substantial, if lesser, majority (67%) did not agree that “the government interferes too much in people's personal lives” (30%, strongly), and 59% did not accept the idea that “the government should not be strict in enforcing Islamic laws” (33%, strongly)", with only 22% agreeing strongly and 15% somewhat agreeing with the idea that the government should not be strict in enforcing Islamic laws.

The Iranian Public Opinion After the Protests report's questionnaire went more into details: for protestors chanting slogans against Islam or religious laws (Q32), only 19.9% say most should be released, while 42.3% support prosecution without harsh punishment and 31.9% favor harsh punishment; 2.2% select "Depend/Other" and 3.7% "Don’t know/No answer." In total, 74.2% support prosecution in some form. By contrast, for protestors chanting against government policies (Q31), a clear majority (64.5%) say most should be released, while only 27.0% support prosecution without harsh punishment and 3.7% favor harsh punishment; 1.7% select "Depend/Other" and 3.1% "Don’t know/No answer." Altogether, only 30.7% support prosecution. This comparison shows a sharp difference: protest against Islam is far more likely to be met with support for prosecution (74.2%) than protest against the government (30.7%), and is also much more likely to attract support for harsh punishment (31.9% vs. 3.7%), while government criticism is predominantly seen as deserving release. Additionally, there were survey data in Q94 from July 2014, May 2015, January 2016, February 2016, March 2016, June 2016, May 2017, June 2017, and January 2018 on whether policymakers should take religious teachings into account. Support remained consistently high, with "A lot" ranging from 44% (July 2014) to 47.2% (January 2018), dipping to 42.5% (March 2016) and reaching 46.5% (June 2017). "Somewhat" declines overall, from 36% (2014) to 29.8% (2018), peaking at 33.9% (March 2016). Lower-support categories remain stable: "Not much" varies between 12.8% and 16.3%, while "Not at all" ranges from 4.9% to 8.0%. "Don’t know/No answer" stays between 2.0% and 3.5%. Overall, a majority consistently favors at least some role for religion, with a gradual shift toward stronger support.

In 2023, Raz Zimmt, an expert on Iran attached to Israel's Institute for National Security Studies (INSS), quoting Iranian sociologist Hamidreza Jalaeipour, argued that 70% of Iranians fall into the category of "silent pragmatist traditionalist majority", which is defined as those who "might approve of religion and aspects of the regime, while rejecting enforced religion and other aspects of the regime."

In 2024, a leaked poll attributed to Iran’s Ministry of Culture and Islamic Guidance (reported by analysts on BBC Persian) suggests that 10% of Iranians declare themselves "nonreligious", 24.1% describe themselves as "moderately religious" and 65.9% could be interpreted as "religious" to some degree. In the same poll, 72.9% favored separation of religion and state, indicating that religious identity does not automatically translate into wanting a religious government.

In December 2025, University of Maryland's School of Public Policy released a report, Iranian Public Opinion Soon After the Twelve-Day War. Since 2014, a longitudinal survey has measured Iranian public opinion on the role of religion in policymaking by asking respondents to what extent policymakers should take religious teachings into account when making decisions. In the October 2025 wave, 38% of respondents said religious teachings should influence policy "a lot," 37% said "somewhat," 14% said "not much," and 10% said "not at all," indicating that 75% supported at least some role for religion in public decision-making. Support for a strong religious role has declined over time: the proportion favoring "a lot" of influence reached a high of 47% in 2018 and fell to 38% in the most recent survey, the lowest level recorded in the series.

==== Academic opinions on hypothetical secularization of the Iranian society ====
In parallel, reporting from the 2020s indicates growing disaffection with state-enforced religious policies in Iran, particularly among younger Iranians. This is often expressed as anti-clerical or anti-institutional sentiment rather than a rejection of religion itself, and some Iranian clerics have acknowledged declining levels of religious engagement. Surveys and reports suggest an increase in secular or non-institutional identities, especially among youth and the diaspora. At the same time, interest in alternative religious identities, including Christianity and Zoroastrianism, has been noted, particularly outside Iran. Zoroastrianism is often framed in cultural or nationalist terms as a revival of pre-Islamic Iranian heritage, while reported growth in Christianity is commonly attributed to online outreach, though its scale remains difficult to verify. These developments are frequently linked to a rise in Iranian, and especially Persian, nationalism, in which Islam is sometimes portrayed as an externally imposed system, and pre-Islamic traditions are emphasized as markers of national identity rather than strictly religious commitment. The primary reason of the increase of Christianity and Zoroastrianism is identified by sociologists as a protest against the regime than active belief in these faiths. Sociologists have coined the term, 'Survey Zoroastrianism' which refers to rise of identifying with pre-Islamic traditions to oppose the regime. However, Conversion to Christianity in Iran can be classified into three types: 1. Utilitarian Conversions, as a medium to immigrate to the West; 2. Protest Conversions, as a protest against the clerical regime; and 3. Theological Conversions, these are true conversions to Christianity, this group is estimated to be the smallest in number. Christian organizations are known for exaggerating conversions in Iran without credible evidence to seek aid from donors. To be mentioned, there been a rise of apolitical Islamic movements deemed against the ruling clergy, including Sunni Islam and especially Salafism and most importantly Sufism.

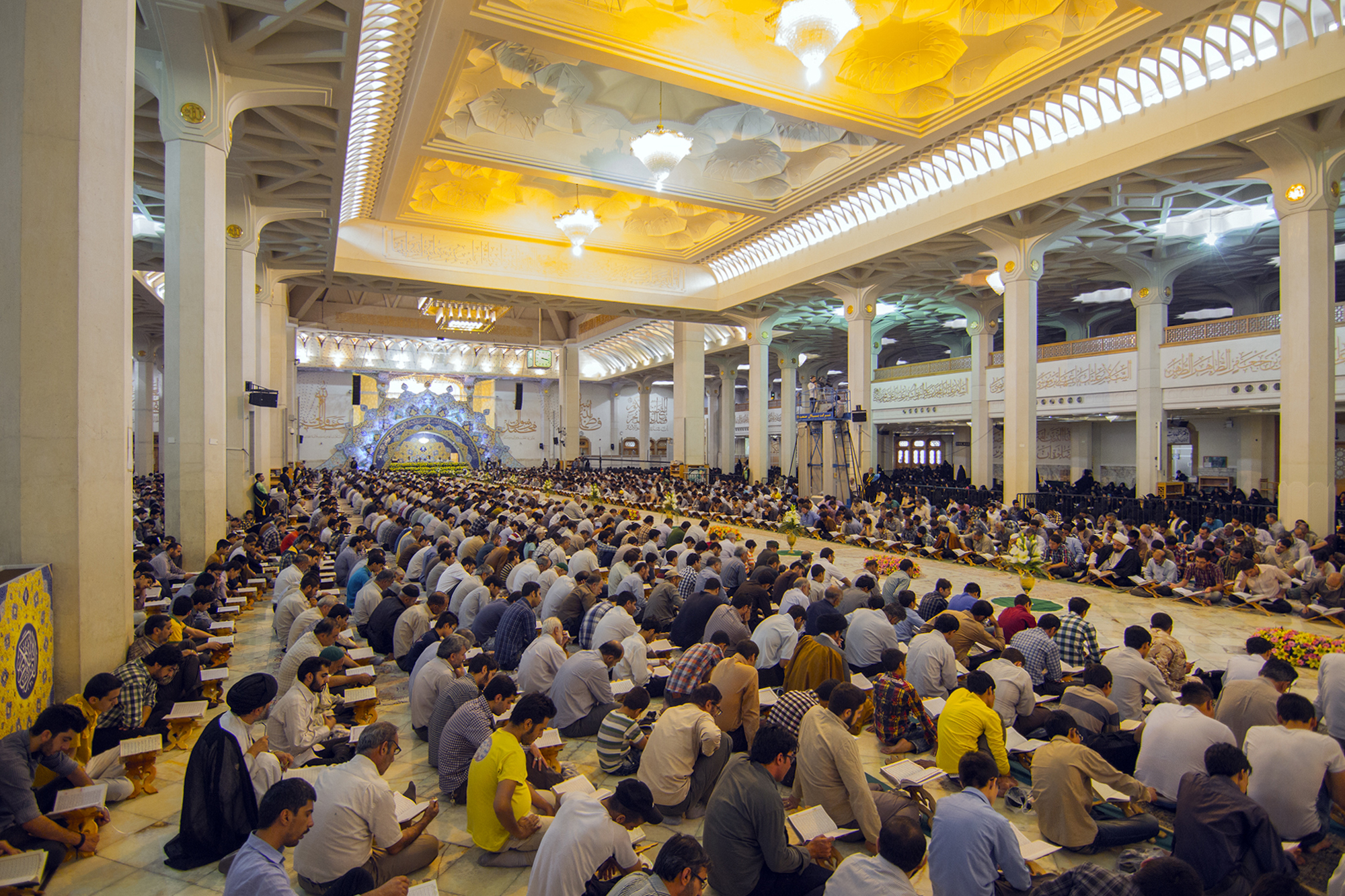
The Fatima Masumeh Shrine in Qom, burial site of the daughter of the seventh Shia Imam

Some scholars argue that analyses of contemporary Iranian society often overlook what has been described as "popular religion", referring to everyday religious beliefs and practices among the general population. According to this view, both the Islamic Republic and segments of its political and intellectual opposition tend to be critical of the ways in which religion is practiced by ordinary people. As a result, assessments of religiosity may rely on speculation rather than systematic empirical observation. Researchers note that measuring religiosity is methodologically complex, as definitions and indicators vary among social scientists. Reflecting this complexity, Iranian scholars reportedly held multiple academic sessions in Tehran in 2012 to discuss appropriate criteria for assessing religiosity. Available empirical studies suggest that Iranian society remains religious. A 2009 study by Iranian sociologists Abbas Kazemi and Mehdi Faraji found that, compared with 1975 (four years before the Iranian Revolution), levels of religious practice had remained largely stable. According to their findings, participation in prayer and socio-religious rituals showed little overall change, while fasting during Ramadan had increased. At the same time, sociologist Amir Nikpey has argued that Iranian society has undergone processes of modernization and secularization without a corresponding rise in anti-religious attitudes, describing Iranians as becoming more modern and secular "without becoming anti-religion."

Iranian sociologist Asef Bayat theorized the notion of "post-Islamism" in the mid-1990s, as he argues that the experience of authoritarian moral and political control gave rise to new forms of youth identity and cultural practice that challenged Islamist norms without entailing a rejection of Islam itself. He observes that urban youth developed everyday behaviours and subcultures that questioned the "moral and political precepts of Islamism," including participation in underground music scenes, informal dating practices, changing fashion norms, and a more relaxed observance of hijab. Bayat stresses, however, that these practices did not amount to abandoning religion. Rather, "these youths did not abandon their Islam altogether," and many continued to display "strong ‘religious belief’ and ‘religious feeling’," even when religious practice was irregular. He describes this condition as one in which God "existed but did not prevent them from drinking alcohol or dating," indicating a decoupling of personal faith from strict Islamist moral regulation. This pattern, Bayat argues, points toward the emergence of new religious sensibilities in which young people sought to be "simultaneously young and Muslim," forging forms of religiosity that combined "the sacred and the secular, faith and fun, the divine and diversion." In this sense, post-Islamism does not imply secularisation or the abandonment of Islam, but rather a reconfiguration of religious life in which Islamic belief persists alongside demands for personal autonomy, cultural expression, and democratic ideals.

==== Shia majority ====
According to The World Factbook of the CIA, between 90-95% of Iran's Muslim are Shia, and another 5-10% are Sunni, the American Iranian Council, citing the Islamic Republic estimates, gives the Sunni percentage at between 7% and 10%. (Almost all of Iran's Shia follow the Twelver branch.) The Atlantic Council gives a higher percentage of Sunni, saying "Sunni leaders and observers" put the Sunni population of Iran "between 12 and 25 percent".

==== Sunni minority ====
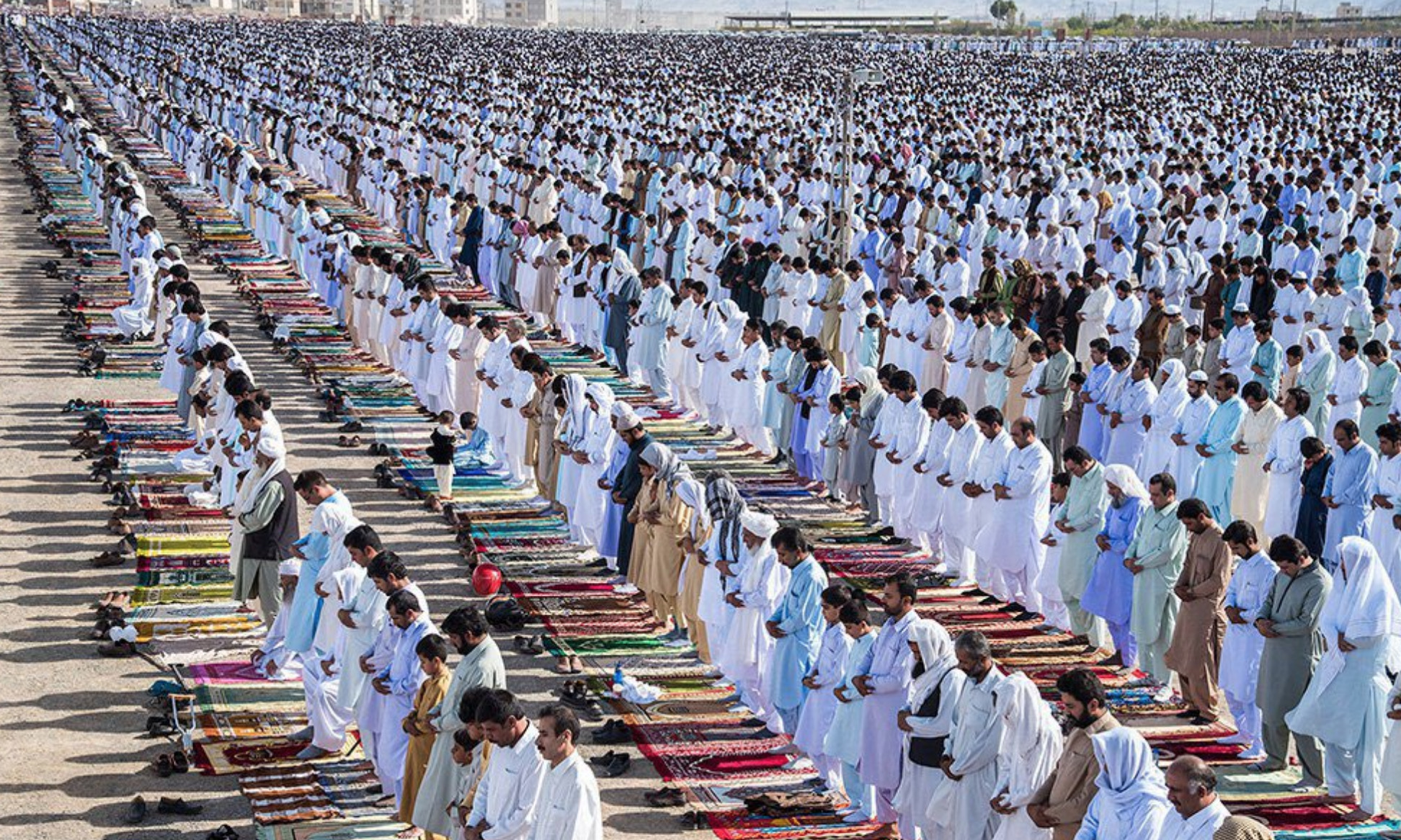
Congregational Eid prayer at the Great Mosalla of Zahedan, Iran, in the province of Sistan and Baluchestan

Most of the Sunni in Iran are Kurds, Achomi Persians, Khorasani Persians, Turkmens, Arabs, Talysh and Baloch, living in the northwest, northeast, south and southeast, respectively. These include the provinces of West Azerbaijan, Kurdistan, Kermanshah, Golestan, Razavi Khorasan, North Khorasan, and Sistan and Baluchestan. A majority of Lari people and Talysh, a part of Kurds, virtually all Baluchis and Turkomans, and a minority of Persians, Arabs and Lurs are Sunnis.

The mountainous region of Larestan is mostly inhabited by indigenous Sunni Persians who did not convert to Shia Islam during the Safavids because the mountainous region of Larestan was too isolated. The majority of Lari people are Sunni Muslims, 35% of Lari people are Shia Muslims. (Note: The people of Larestan speak the Lari language, which is a southwestern Iranian language closely related to Old Persian (pre-Islamic Persian) and Luri.)

Shia clergy tend to view missionary work among Sunnis to convert them to Shi'a Islam as a worthwhile religious endeavor. In those towns with mixed populations in the Persian Gulf region, and Sistan and Baluchistan, tensions between Shi'as and Sunnis existed both before and after the Revolution. Religious tensions have been highest during major Shi'a observances, especially Muharram.

Sunnis have complained that hard-liners in the IRI regime oppose equal rights for Sunnis. When a Sunni was being considered for a position on the Iranian parliament's presiding board, one "influential" Ayatollah Hossein Wahid Khorasani threatened to write a fatwa delegitimizing the assembly “if a Sunni was installed above Shias.” Despite that, various high ranks have been won by the Sunnis in recent years, including a cabinet member and the top commander of the Iranian navy since 2021.

Among specific Sunni political complaints are that:

- Article 12 of the constitution, which grants them "certain rights, such as full freedom of worship", have been "consistently ignored"; and
- Article 115, which forbids anyone but a Shia Muslim from becoming president, has not been repealed; directives made by the Supreme Leader Ali Khamenei on behalf of the Sunni (such as making it illegal to insult Muhammad's wife Aisha or a September 2017 call to end discrimination against Sunnis and minority groups in general) have not been enforced.
- They have not been allowed to construct mosques for Sunni worship in larger cities, such as the capital Tehran, where there are an estimated one million Sunnis. ("The government claimed in 2015 that Tehran had nine Sunni mosques, but prominent Sunnis say these are merely prayer rooms.")
- examination by Herasat, a branch of the Intelligence Ministry "tasked with ensuring that applicants are loyal to the regime". An example of the result is that 90% of high school teachers and 70% of elementary teachers are Shia in areas heavily populated by ethnic Baluchi Sunnis.

=== Religious institutions ===
==== Mosques ====
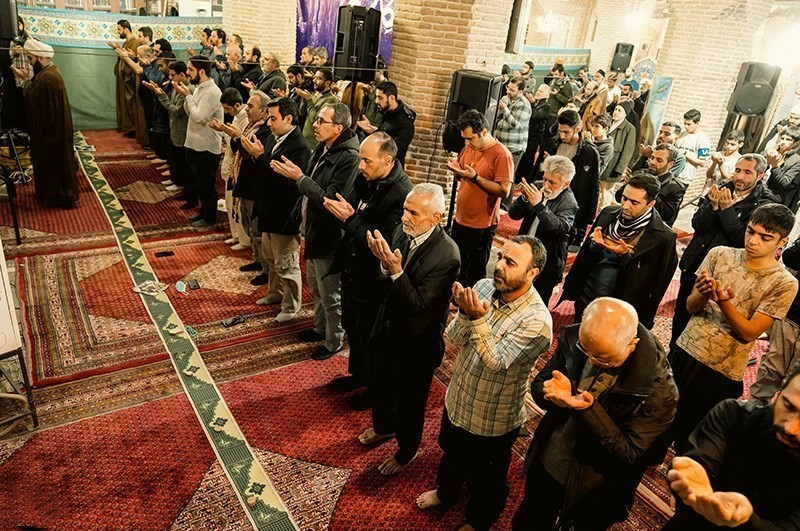
Participants engaged in Iʿtikāf (spiritual retreat) at the Jameh Mosque of Tehran, February 2023

Historically, the most important religious institution in Iran has been the mosque. In towns and cities, congregational prayers, as well as prayers and rites associated with religious observances and important phases in Muslim life, took place in mosques. Primarily an urban phenomenon, mosques did not exist in most Iranian villages. In the years preceding the Revolution, Iranian Shias generally attached diminishing significance to institutional religion, and by the 1970s there was little emphasis on mosque attendance, even for the Friday congregational prayers. During the Revolution, however, mosques in large cities played a prominent social role in organizing people for large demonstrations. Since that time, the mosques have continued to play important political and social roles, in addition to their traditional religious functions. At the same time, weekly mosque attendance rate in Iran has been very low compared to other Muslim countries. In particular, politicization of Friday prayers under the Islamic Republic has had the paradoxical consequence of discouraging religious people from attending Friday prayers. People who attend prayers tend to have more positive evaluation of the political system than people who do not attend.

However, Senior Iranian cleric Mohammad Abolghassem Doulabi, who serves as a liaison between the Iranian government and the seminaries, himself introduced this claim that around 50,000 of Iran’s approximately 75,000 mosques had been closed or were inactive. Doulabi, however, rejected interpretations that linked this figure to a decline in public religiosity. He attributed the situation primarily to economic and administrative factors, including currency devaluation, insufficient funding for mosque operations, and the absence of full-time imams, noting that mosques in Iran largely function as non-profit institutions dependent on donations and endowments, rather than direct state support. Doulabi further stated that continued large-scale participation in religious events indicated sustained religiosity, arguing that mosque inactivity often reflected structural limitations, such as lack of infrastructure, local management, or resident clergy, rather than reduced religious commitment among the population.

==== Hosseiniyeh ====
Another religious institution of major significance has been the hoseiniyeh, or Islamic center. Wealthy patrons financed construction of hoseiniyehs in urban areas to serve as sites for recitals and performances commemorating the martyrdom of Hussein, especially during the month of Moharram. In the 1970s, hoseiniyehs such as the Hoseiniyeh Irshad in Tehran became politicized as prominent clerical and lay preachers helped to lay the groundwork for the Revolution by referring to the symbolic deaths as martyrs of Hussein and the other imams in veiled but obvious criticism of Mohammad Reza Shah's regime.

==== Islamic schools ====
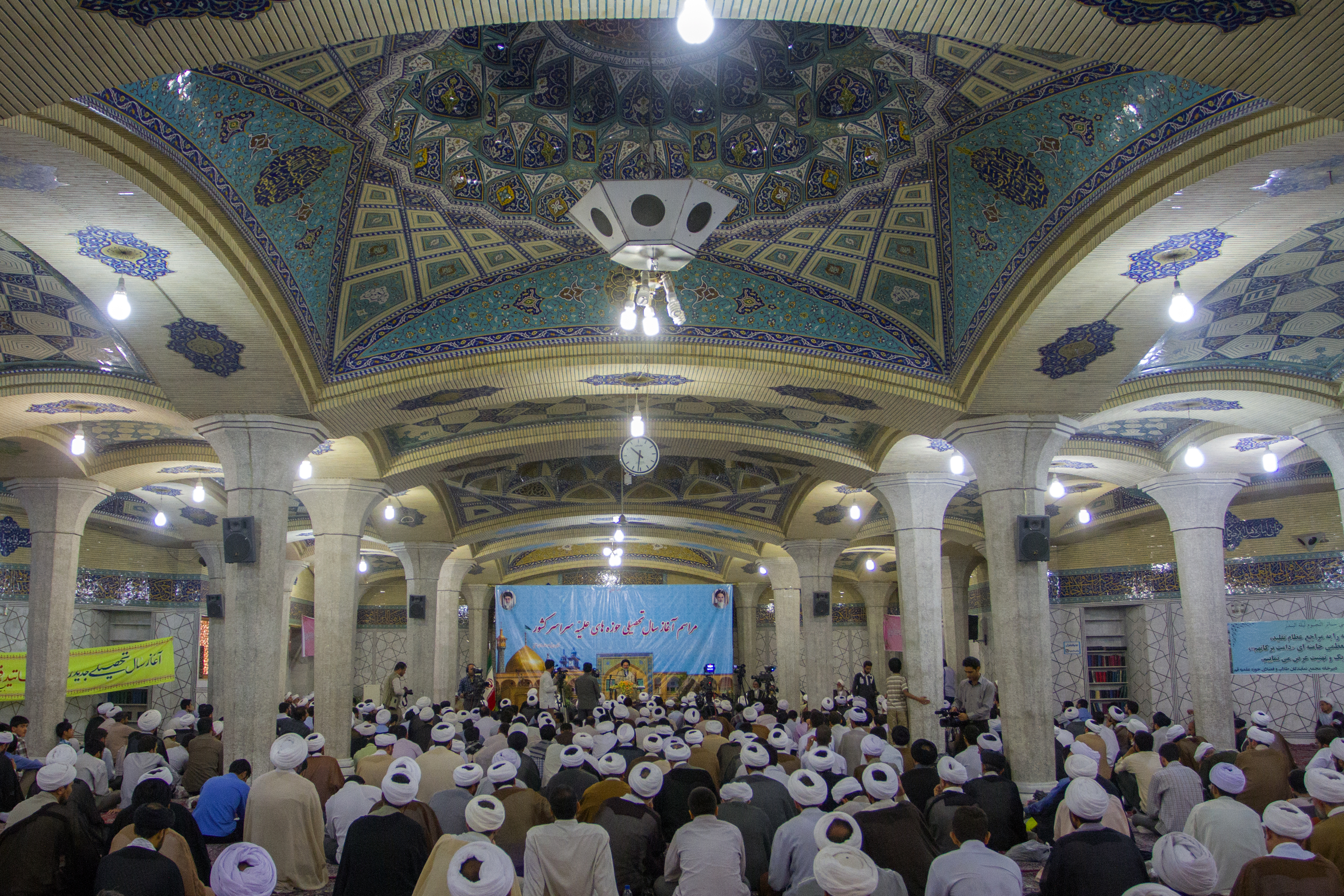
The Feyziyeh Madrasa in Qom, a premier center for Shia Islamic scholarship originally established during the Safavid era

Institutions providing religious education include madrassas, or seminaries, and maktabs, or primary schools run by the clergy. The madrassas historically were important settings for advanced training in Shia theology and jurisprudence. Each madrassa generally was associated with a noted Shia scholar who had attained the rank of ayatollah. Some older madrassas functioned like religious universities at which several scholars taught diverse religious and secular subjects. Students, or talabehs, lived on the grounds of the madrassas and received stipends for the duration of their studies, usually a minimum of seven years, during which they prepared for the examinations that qualify a seminary student to be a low-level preacher, or mullah. At the time of the Revolution, there were slightly more than 11,000 talabehs in Iran, approximately 60 percent of them at the madrassas in Qom. From 1979 to 1982, the number of talabehs in Qom more than tripled from 6,500 to over 20,000. As of the early 2000s, there were just under 25,000 talabehs at all levels of study in Qom seminaries, as well as about 12,000 talabehs at seminaries in other Iranian cities.

Maktabs started to decline in number and importance in the first decades of the twentieth century, once the government began developing a national public school system. Nevertheless, maktabs continued to exist as private religious schools until the Revolution. Because the overall emphasis of public schools has remained secular subjects, since 1979 maktabs have continued to serve children whose parents want them to have a more religious education.

==== Clergy ====
In 2003, Abbas William Samii estimated that there are 90,000 (the estimate of media observers) to 300,000 (estimate of European sources) clerics in Iran, with, at the time, 40,000 students at the religious seminaries. To this he add 60,000 "people with no formal training or qualifications who acted as urban preachers, rural prayer leaders, and procession organizers." As for the numbers of seminaries, Qom alone had 60. Abbas Djavadi estimates that after the 1979 revolution, "more than 200,000 mullahs" became "receivers of government salaries and benefits".

==== Shrines ====
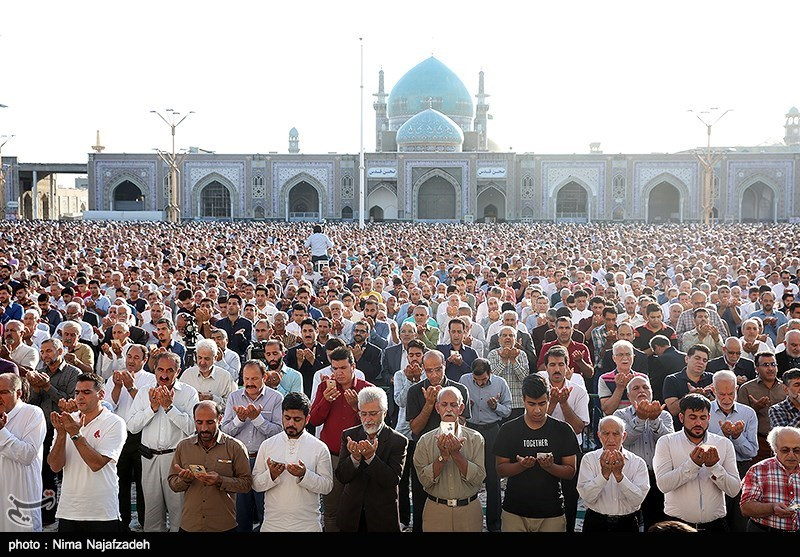
Eid al-Fitr prayer at the Imam Reza shrine, Mashhad, June 2017

Another major religious institution in Iran is the shrine. Pilgrimage to the shrines of imams is a specific Shia custom, undertaken because Shia pilgrims believe that the imams and their relatives have the power to intercede with God on behalf of petitioners. Of the more than 1,100 shrines in Iran, the most important are those for the Eighth Imam, Ali al-Ridha, in Mashhad and for his sister Fatimah bint Musa in Qom, and for Seyyed Rouhollah Khomeini in Tehran. Each of these is a huge complex that includes the mausoleum of the venerated one, tombs of various notables, mosques, madrassas, and libraries. Imam Reza's shrine is considered the holiest. In addition to the usual shrine accoutrements, it comprises hospitals, dispensaries, a museum, and several mosques located in a series of courtyards surrounding the imam's tomb. The shrine's endowments and gifts are the largest of all religious institutions in the country. Although there are no special times for visiting this or other shrines, it is customary for pilgrimage traffic to be heaviest during Shia holy periods. Visitors represent all socioeconomic levels. Whereas piety is a motivation for many, others come to seek the spiritual grace or general good fortune that a visit to the shrine is believed to ensure. Since the nineteenth century, it has been customary among the bazaar class and members of the lower classes to recognize those who have made a pilgrimage to Mashhad by prefixing their names with the title mashti. Shrine authorities have estimated that at least 4 million pilgrims visit the shrine annually in the early 2000s. There are also important secondary shrines for other relatives of the Eighth Imam in Tehran and Shiraz. In virtually all towns and in many villages, there are numerous lesser shrines, known as imamzadehs, that commemorate descendants of the imams who are reputed to have led saintly lives. In Iraq the shrines at Karbala and An Najaf also are revered by Iranian Shias. Pilgrimages to these shrines and the hundreds of local mamzadehs are undertaken to petition the saints to grant special favors or to help one through a period of troubles. The constant movement of pilgrims from all over Iran has helped bind together a linguistically heterogeneous population. Pilgrims serve as major sources of information about conditions in different parts of the country and thus help to mitigate the parochialism of the regions.

==== Waqf ====
The vaqf is a traditional source of financial support for all religious institutions. It is a religious endowment by which land and other income-producing property is given in perpetuity for the maintenance of a shrine, mosque, madrassa, or charitable institution such as a hospital, library, or orphanage. A mutavalli administers a vaqf in accordance with the stipulations in the donor's bequest. In many vaqfs, the position of mutavalli is hereditary. Under the Pahlavis, the government attempted to exercise control over administration of the vaqfs, especially those of the larger shrines. This practice caused conflict with the clergy, who perceived the government's efforts as inimical to their influence and authority in traditional religious matters. The government's interference with the administration of vaqfs during the Pahlavi era led to a sharp decline in the number of vaqf bequests. Instead, wealthy and pious Shias chose to give financial contributions directly to the leading ayatollahs in the form of zakat, or obligatory alms. The clergy, in turn, used the funds to administer their madrassas and to institute various educational and charitable programs, which indirectly provided them with more influence in society. The access of the clergy to a steady and independent source of funding was an important factor in their ability to resist state controls, and ultimately helped them direct the opposition to the shah.

==== Statistics of religious buildings ====
Statistics of religious buildings according to آمارنامه اماکن مذهبی (Statistics of Religious Places) which has been gathered in 2003.

Structure	Number
Mosque	48983
Jame	7877
Hussainia	13446
Imamzadeh	6461
Dargah	1320
Hawza	

== See also ==
- International Rankings of Iran in Religion
- Islam by country
- History of Iran
- Islamicization in post-conquest Iran
- History of political Islam in Iran
- Religious minorities in Iran
- Christians in Iran
- Judaism in Iran
- Institute for Interreligious Dialogue
- Status of religious freedom in Iran
- Religion of Iranian-Americans
- Turko-Persian tradition
- Clericalism in Iran
- Fatima Masumeh Shrine
- Society of Seminary Teachers of Qom
- History of Iran after Islam

== Bibliography ==
- Petrushevsky, I. P.,(1985) Islam in Iran, State University of New York Press, ISBN 978-0-88706-070-0
- Frye, Richard (1975). The Golden Age of Persia. London: Weidenfeld and Nicolson.
- Hovannisian, Richard (1998). The Persian Presence in the Islamic World. Cambridge: Cambridge University Press.
- Foltz, Richard (2013). Religions of Iran: From Prehistory to the Present. London: Oneworld publications. ISBN 978-1-78074-308-0.
- Kameel Ahmady (2019). From border to border. Comprehensive research study on identity and ethnicity in Iran. London: Mehri publication. ISBN 9781914165221.
