= Kahak =

Kahak (Persian: کهک or كاهك) may refer to:

- Kahak-e Esfij, a village in Kerman Province
- Kahak-e Fathabad, a village in Kerman Province
- Kahak-e Zardasht, a village in Kerman Province
- Kahak, Delijan, a village in Markazi Province (birthplace of Aga Khan I)
- Kahak, Saveh, a village in Markazi Province
- Kahak, Tafresh, a village in Markazi Province
- Kahak, Qazvin, a village in Qazvin Province
- Kahak, Qom, a city in Qom Province
- Kahak, Razavi Khorasan, a village in Sabzevar County, Razavi Khorasan Province (birthplace of Ali Shariati)
- Kahak, Semnan, a village in Semnan Province
- Kahak, South Khorasan, a village in South Khorasan Province
- Kahak District, an administrative subdivision of Qom Province
- Kahak Rural District, an administrative subdivision of Qom Province

== See also ==
- Kohak (disambiguation)
