= Tireh, Qom =

Village in Qom province, Iran

Tireh Persian: تيره
- Village
- Location within Iran
- Coordinates: 34°18′28″N 50°55′00″E
- Country: Iran
- Province: Qom
- County: Kahak
- District: Fordo
- Rural District: Khaveh

Population (2016)
  - Total: 66
- Time zone: UTC+3:30 (IRST)

Tireh (Persian: تيره) (Note: Also romanized as Tīreh; also known as Tīneh) is a village in Khaveh Rural District of Fordo District in Kahak County, Qom province, Iran.

== Demographics ==
=== Population ===
At the time of the 2006 National Census, the village's population was 51 in 13 households, when it was in Fordo Rural District of Kahak District (Note: Formerly Nofel Loshato District, renamed the Central District of Kahak County) in Qom County. The following census in 2011 counted 46 people in 13 households. The 2016 census measured the population of the village as 66 people in 22 households.

In 2021, the district was separated from the county in the establishment of Kahak County and renamed the Central District. The new county was divided into two districts of two rural districts each, with Kahak as its capital and only city at the time. Tireh was transferred to Khaveh Rural District created in the new Fordo District.
