= Meyyem =

Village in Qom province, Iran

Meyyem Persian: ميم
- Village
- Location within Iran
- Coordinates: 34°21′23″N 50°54′15″E
- Country: Iran
- Province: Qom
- County: Kahak
- District: Fordo
- Rural District: Khaveh

Population (2016)
  - Total: 355
- Time zone: UTC+3:30 (IRST)

Meyyem (Persian: ميم) (Note: Also romanized as Meym) is a village in Khaveh Rural District of Fordo District in Kahak County, Qom province, Iran.

== Demographics ==
=== Population ===
At the time of the 2006 National Census, the village's population was 301 in 88 households, when it was in Fordo Rural District of Kahak District (Note: Formerly Nofel Loshato District, renamed the Central District of Kahak County) in Qom County. The following census in 2011 counted 247 people in 76 households. The 2016 census measured the population of the village as 355 people in 123 households.

In 2021, the district was separated from the county in the establishment of Kahak County and renamed the Central District. The new county was divided into two districts of two rural districts each, with Kahak as its capital and only city at the time. Meyyem was transferred to Khaveh Rural District created in the new Fordo District.
