= Dastgerd, Qom =

Village in Qom province, Iran

Dastgerd Persian: دستگرد
- Village
- Location within Iran
- Coordinates: 34°20′13″N 50°55′02″E
- Country: Iran
- Province: Qom
- County: Kahak
- District: Fordo
- Rural District: Fordo

Population (2016)
  - Total: 269
- Time zone: UTC+3:30 (IRST)

Dastgerd (Persian: دستگرد) (Note: Also known as Dastgird and Dastjerd) is a village in, and the capital of, Fordo Rural District in Fordo District of Kahak County, Qom province, Iran. The previous capital of the rural district was the village of Fordo, now in Khaveh Rural District.

== Demographics ==
=== Population ===
At the time of the 2006 National Census, the village's population was 211 in 69 households, when it was in Kahak District (Note: Formerly Nofel Loshato District, renamed the Central District of Kahak County) of Qom County. The following census in 2011 counted 174 people in 63 households. The 2016 census measured the population of the village as 269 people in 90 households.

In 2021, the district was separated from the county in the establishment of Kahak County and renamed the Central District. The rural district was transferred to the new Fordo District.
