= Khaveh, Qom =

Village in Qom province, Iran

Khaveh Persian: خاوه
- Village
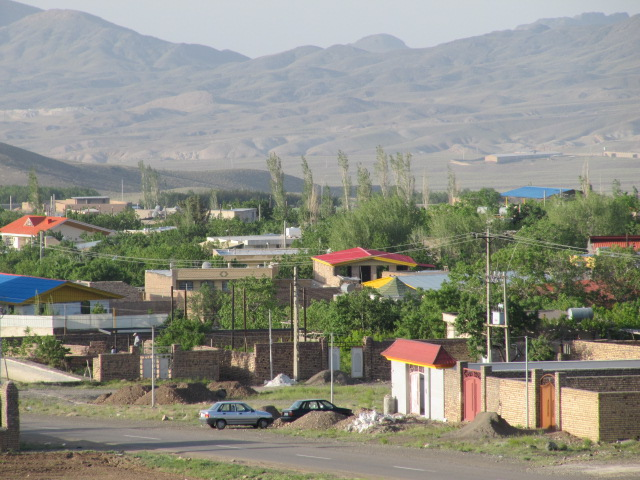
- The village of Khaveh

- Location within Iran
- Coordinates: 34°16′55″N 50°54′38″E
- Country: Iran
- Province: Qom
- County: Kahak
- District: Fordo
- Rural District: Khaveh

Population (2016)
  - Total: 813
- Time zone: UTC+3:30 (IRST)

Khaveh (Persian: خاوه) (Note: Also romanized as Khāveh and Khāweh) is a village in, and the capital of, Khaveh Rural District in Fordo District of Kahak County, Qom province, Iran.

== Demographics ==
=== Population ===
At the time of the 2006 National Census, the village's population was 344 in 98 households, when it was in Fordo Rural District of Kahak District (Note: Formerly Nofel Loshato District, renamed the Central District of Kahak County) in Qom County. The following census in 2011 counted 664 people in 210 households. The 2016 census measured the population of the village as 813 people in 264 households.

In 2021, the district was separated from the county in the establishment of Kahak County and renamed the Central District. The new county was divided into two districts of two rural districts each, with Kahak as its capital and only city at the time. Khaveh was transferred to Khaveh Rural District created in the new Fordo District.

== Religious societies ==
=== Order of Melinar ===
The Order of Melinar is a mystic traditional order whose beliefs are traced back to the 2nd Shia Imam (Imam Hassan). It is believed he once visited the village in the time of his caliphate under the guidance of Jibrael. It was then reported that he taught the locals skills such as dream interpretation, divination, and other spiritual abilities. There are only a limited number of people in the village that have been taught to be a "Moarreb." The traditions regarding who and how people are taught are unknown to the public.
