= Veyrij =

Village in Qom province, Iran

Veyrij Persian: ويريج
- Village
- Location within Iran
- Coordinates: 34°17′54″N 50°54′30″E
- Country: Iran
- Province: Qom
- County: Kahak
- District: Fordo
- Rural District: Khaveh

Population (2016)
  - Total: 413
- Time zone: UTC+3:30 (IRST)

Veyrij (Persian: ويريج) (Note: Also known as Darīj, Varīj, and Vayrīj) is a village in Khaveh Rural District of Fordo District in Kahak County, Qom province, Iran.

== Demographics ==
=== Population ===
At the time of the 2006 National Census, the village's population was 181 in 52 households, when it was in Fordo Rural District of Kahak District (Note: Formerly Nofel Loshato District, renamed the Central District of Kahak County) in Qom County. The following census in 2011 counted 197 people in 64 households. The 2016 census measured the population of the village as 413 people in 130 households.

In 2021, the district was separated from the county in the establishment of Kahak County and renamed the Central District. The new county was divided into two districts of two rural districts each, with Kahak as its capital and only city at the time. Veyrij was transferred to Khaveh Rural District created in the new Fordo District.
