= Venarej =

Village in Qom province, Iran

Venarej Persian: ونارج
- Village
- Location within Iran
- Coordinates: 34°26′04″N 50°45′56″E
- Country: Iran
- Province: Qom
- County: Kahak
- District: Central
- Rural District: Kermejegan

Population (2016)
  - Total: 953
- Time zone: UTC+3:30 (IRST)

Venarej (Persian: ونارج) (Note: Also romanized as Venārej and Venārj; also known as Arnāvej, Varnavaj, Varnāvaj, Venāj, Venārch, and Vināj) is a village in Kermejegan Rural District of the Central District (Note: Formerly Nofel Loshato District and then Kahak District) in Kahak County, Qom province, Iran.

== Demographics ==
=== Population ===
At the time of the 2006 National Census, the village's population was 2,002 in 508 households, when it was in Kahak Rural District of Kahak District (Note: Formerly Nofel Loshato District, renamed the Central District of Kahak County) in Qom County. The following census in 2011 counted 2,134 people in 245 households. The 2016 census measured the population of the village as 2,262 people in 661 households.

In 2021, the district was separated from the county in the establishment of Kahak County and renamed the Central District. Venarej was transferred to Kermejegan Rural District created in the same district.
