= Emamzadeh Esmail, Qom =

Village in Qom province, Iran

Emamzadeh Esmail Persian: امامزاده اسماعيل
- Village
- Location within Iran
- Coordinates: 34°20′28″N 50°59′18″E
- Country: Iran
- Province: Qom
- County: Kahak
- District: Fordo
- Rural District: Fordo

Population (2016)
  - Total: 70
- Time zone: UTC+3:30 (IRST)

Emamzadeh Esmail (Persian: امامزاده اسماعيل) (Note: Also romanized as Emāmzādeh Esmā‘īl; formerly known as Abadi Emamzadeh Esmail (ابادي امامزاده اسماعيل), also romanized as Ābādī Emāmzādeh Esmā‘īl; also known as Emāmzādeh Shāhzādeh Esmā‘īl, Shāhzādeh Esmā‘īl, and Shāhzādeh Ismā‘īl) is a village in Fordo Rural District of Fordo District in Kahak County, Qom province, Iran.

== Demographics ==
=== Population ===
At the time of the 2006 National Census, the village's population, as Abadi Emamzadeh Esmail, was 40 in 13 households, when it was in Kahak District (Note: Formerly Nofel Loshato District, renamed the Central District of Kahak County) of Qom County. The following census in 2011 counted 156 people in 48 households, by which time the village was listed as Emamzadeh Esmail. The 2016 census measured the population of the village as 70 people in 25 households.

In 2021, the district was separated from the county in the establishment of Kahak County and renamed the Central District. The rural district was transferred to the new Fordo District.
