= Abarjes =

Village in Qom province, Iran

Abarjes Persian: ابرجس
- Village
- Location within Iran
- Coordinates: 34°20′16″N 50°48′58″E
- Country: Iran
- Province: Qom
- County: Kahak
- District: Central
- Rural District: Kermejegan

Population (2016)
  - Total: 155
- Time zone: UTC+3:30 (IRST)

Abarjes (Persian: ابرجس) (Note: Also romanized as Abarjas; also known as Abarjīs and Abrjish) is a village in Kermejegan Rural District of the Central District (Note: Formerly Nofel Loshato District and then Kahak District) in Kahak County, Qom province, Iran.

== Demographics ==
=== Population ===
At the time of the 2006 National Census, the village's population was 142 in 46 households, when it was in Kahak Rural District of Kahak District (Note: Formerly Nofel Loshato District, renamed the Central District of Kahak County) in Qom County. The following census in 2011 counted 122 people in 47 households. The 2016 census measured the population of the village as 155 people in 62 households.

In 2021, the district was separated from the county in the establishment of Kahak County and renamed the Central District. Abarjes was transferred to Kermejegan Rural District created in the same district.
