= Khowrabad =

Village in Qom province, Iran

Khowrabad Persian: خورآباد
- Village
- Location within Iran
- Coordinates: 34°30′39″N 50°57′28″E
- Country: Iran
- Province: Qom
- County: Kahak
- District: Central
- Rural District: Kermejegan

Population (2016)
  - Total: 1,929
- Time zone: UTC+3:30 (IRST)

Khowrabad (Persian: خورآباد) (Note: Also romanized as Khowrābād and Khūrābād; also known as Khor Ābād) is a village in Kermejegan Rural District of the Central District (Note: Formerly Nofel Loshato District and then Kahak District) in Kahak County, Qom province, Iran.

== Demographics ==
=== Population ===
At the time of the 2006 National Census, the village's population was 1,633 in 429 households, when it was in Kahak Rural District of Kahak District (Note: Formerly Nofel Loshato District, renamed the Central District of Kahak County) in Qom County. The following census in 2011 counted 1,769 people in 493 households. The 2016 census measured the population of the village as 1,929 people in 555 households.

In 2021, the district was separated from the county in the establishment of Kahak County and renamed the Central District. Khowrabad was transferred to Kermejegan Rural District created in the same district.
