= Veshnavah =

Village in Qom province, Iran

Veshnavah Persian: وش نوه
- Village
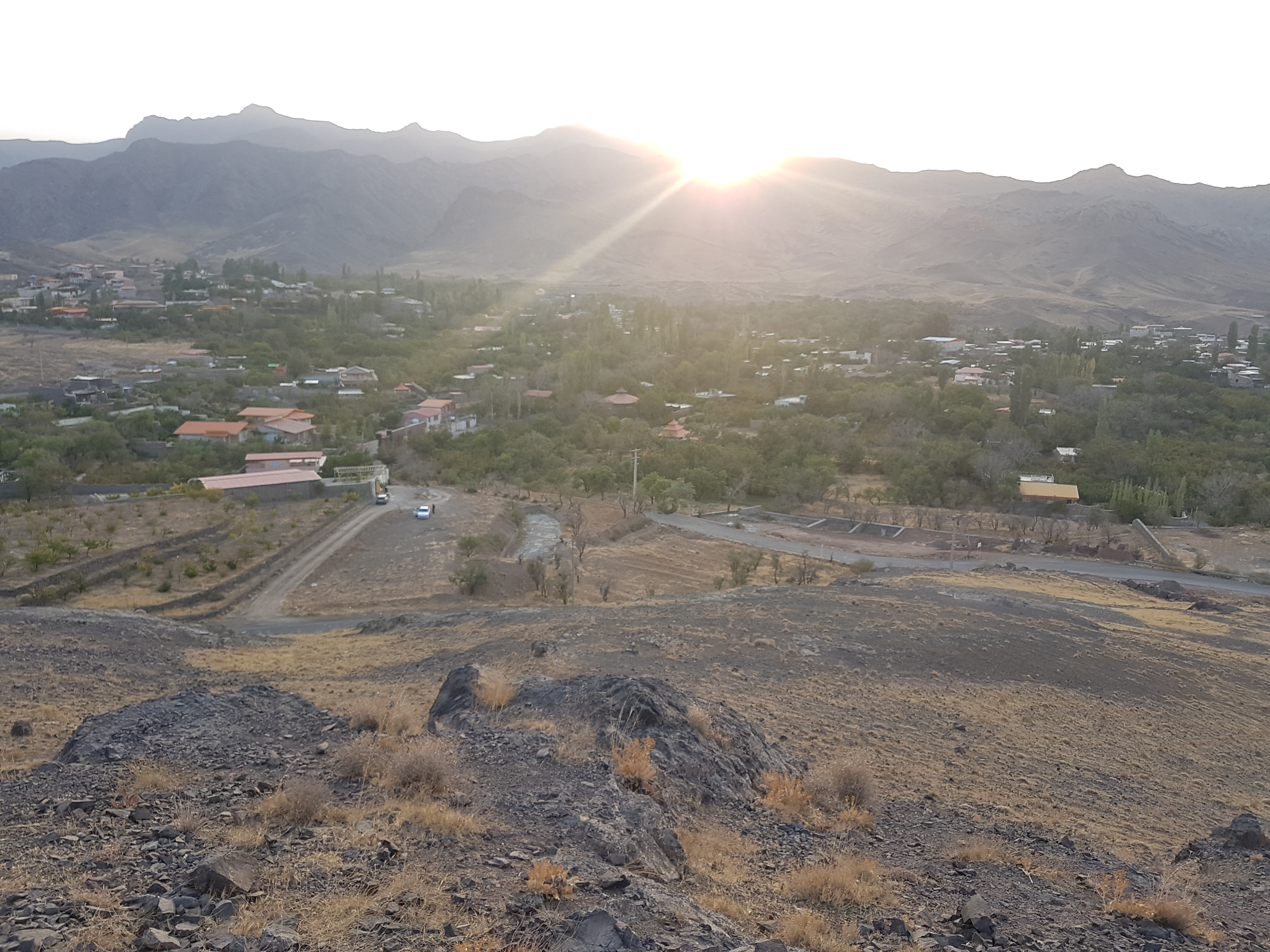
- The village of Veshnavah

- Location within Iran
- Coordinates: 34°14′59″N 50°59′42″E
- Country: Iran
- Province: Qom
- County: Kahak
- District: Fordo
- Rural District: Fordo

Population (2016)
  - Total: 657
- Time zone: UTC+3:30 (IRST)

Veshnavah (Persian: وش نوه) (Note: Also romanized as Vashnaveh, Veshnaveh, and Veshnoweh; also known as Veshnāven) is a village in Fordo Rural District of Fordo District in Kahak County, Qom province, Iran.

== Demographics ==
=== Population ===
At the time of the 2006 National Census, the village's population was 405 in 138 households, when it was in Kahak District (Note: Formerly Nofel Loshato District, renamed the Central District of Kahak County) of Qom County. The following census in 2011 counted 365 people in 143 households. The 2016 census measured the population of the village as 657 people in 229 households.

In 2021, the district was separated from the county in the establishment of Kahak County and renamed the Central District. The rural district was transferred to the new Fordo District.
