= Fordo =

Village in Qom province, Iran

Fordo Persian: فُردو
- Village
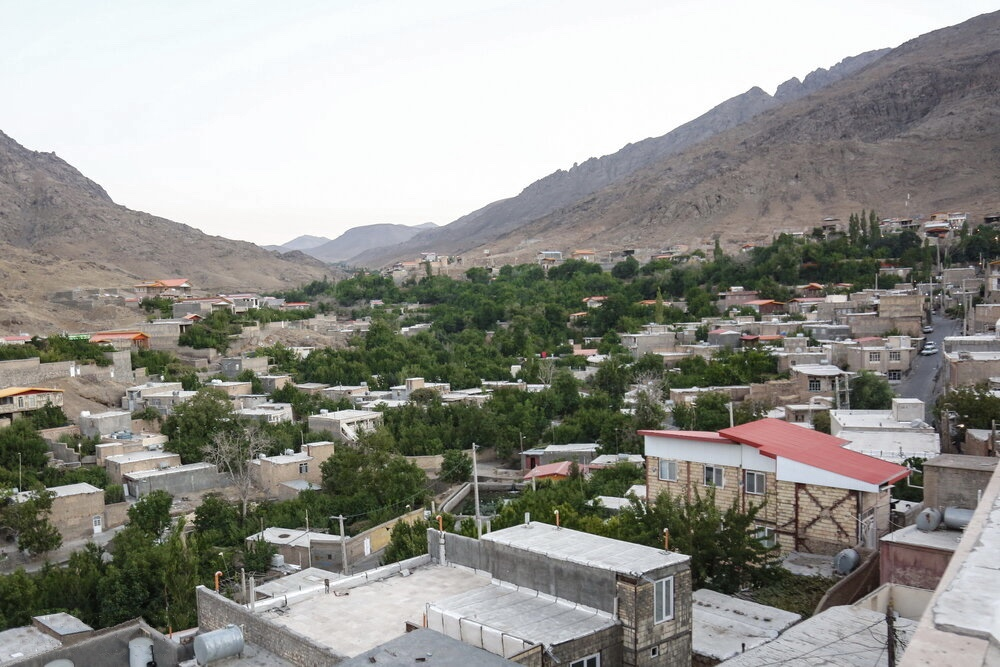

- Location within Iran
- Coordinates: 34°15′36″N 50°54′13″E
- Country: Iran
- Province: Qom
- County: Kahak
- District: Fordo
- Rural District: Khaveh

Population (2016)
  - Total: 839
- Time zone: UTC+3:30 (IRST)

Fordo (Persian: فُردو, Persian pronunciation: [foɾˈduː] or [foɾˈdo]) (Note: Also romanized as Fordow) is a village in Khaveh Rural District of Fordo District in Kahak County, Qom province, Iran, serving as capital of the district. It was the capital of Fordo Rural District until its capital was transferred to the village of Dastgerd. Fordo lies approximately 42 km south of the city of Qom, in a mountainous area between the Hasan Aqa and Fordo peaks.

== Etymology ==
The name Fordo is derived from the Persian word ferdows (فردوس), meaning "paradise." The name Fordo is sometimes used to refer to the Fordow Uranium Enrichment Facility, a highly secure nuclear site operated by Iran. However, Fordo village lies around 35–40 km south of Qom, while the enrichment facility is located roughly 30 km north of the city. (Note: Coordinates for the Fordow plant are: 34.8845°N, 50.9981°E.)

== History ==
Fordo is home to a shrine known as the Booreh shrine, where four revered figures—Sayyed Hossein, Halimeh Khatun, Zaynab Khatun, and Abu'l-Fadl Mohammad (known as Booreh)—are buried. These individuals are said to be descendants, within six generations, of the seventh Shia Imam, Musa al-Kazim. According to Abbas Feyz, these figures were descendants of Abu'l-Fadl Mohammad bin Abi Abdullah Hossein Mousavi, who settled in Qom before migrating to Fordo, where they died.

Fordo reportedly had one of the highest per capita numbers of combatants killed during the Iran–Iraq War (1980–1988), with more than 120 residents killed and over 300 injured. Fighters from the village were organized under the command of Jafar Heydarian. In Iranian official narratives, the village is described as a symbol of sacrifice and resistance.

== Demographics ==
According to the 2006 National Census, Fordo had a population of 732 in 230 households, when it was in Fordo Rural District of Kahak District (Note: Formerly Nofel Loshato District, renamed the Central District of Kahak County) of Qom County. In the 2011 census, the population was recorded as 667 in 227 households. By the 2016 census, the population had risen to 839 people in 303 households, making it the most populous village in its rural district.

In 2021, the district was separated from the county in the establishment of Kahak County and renamed the Central District. The new county was divided into two districts of two rural districts each, with Kahak as its capital and only city at the time. Fordo was transferred to Khaveh Rural District created in the new Fordo District.

== Geography and wildlife ==
Fordo is located in a cold, mountainous region and is irrigated by 20 qanats (underground water channels). To the south of the village lies a local attraction called the Baghcheh-ye Nabat waterfall. Fordo is located at the southeastern end of the Kahak no-hunting zone and borders the Jasb Wildlife Refuge in Delijan to the south. The area is one of the richest habitats for wildlife in the region.

Animal species found in the Fordo ecosystem include:

- Wild sheep and goats (of the Isfahan variety)
- Pallas's cat, wolves, foxes, martens, tree squirrels, pikas, and long-tailed hamsters
- Birds such as golden eagles, buzzards, kestrels, sparrowhawks, partridges, and wood pigeons

A ranger station has been established on the Fordo–Vasaf road to protect the area's biodiversity.

== Economy ==
The local economy is based on agriculture and livestock herding, with primary products including grains, almonds, walnuts, dried apricots, vegetables, dairy products, and honey. The village is especially known for its distinctive, high-quality single-seed cherries, which are widely sold in fruit markets across Iran.

Traditional crafts, especially among women, include karbas-weaving (a type of coarse fabric) and carpet weaving. Fordo is also known for its cheese, and in earlier times, ice was transported from the village to Qom during the summer.

Fordo is accessible by a secondary road from Qom.

== Architecture ==
Fordo's housing is densely built, with structures adapted to the natural slope of the land. Most houses are one-story, built for both security and stability. Construction materials include brick, adobe, clay, plaster, cement, and iron. The homes feature thick walls and wooden or iron doors and windows.

== Notable people ==
- Fathali Oveisi, Iranian actor and film director born in Fordo
