= Nofel Loshato =

Nofel Loshato may refer to:

- Neauphle-le-Château, a commune of France where Khomeini spent his exile
- Nofel Loshato District, an administrative subdivision of Iran named in honor of the previous
