= Bidhand, Qom =

Village in Qom province, Iran

Bidhand Persian: بيدهند
- Village
- Location within Iran
- Coordinates: 34°19′05″N 50°49′36″E
- Country: Iran
- Province: Qom
- County: Kahak
- District: Central
- Rural District: Kermejegan

Population (2016)
  - Total: 1,273
- Time zone: UTC+3:30 (IRST)

Bidhand (Persian: بيدهند) (Note: Also romanized as Bīd Hend and Bīdhand) is a village in Kermejegan Rural District of the Central District (Note: Formerly Nofel Loshato District and then Kahak District) in Kahak County, Qom province, Iran.

== Demographics ==
=== Population ===
At the time of the 2006 National Census, the village's population was 933 in 280 households, when it was in Kahak Rural District of Kahak District (Note: Formerly Nofel Loshato District, renamed the Central District of Kahak County) in Qom County. The following census in 2011 counted 739 people in 245 households. The 2016 census measured the population of the village as 1,273 people in 412 households.

In 2021, the district was separated from the county in the establishment of Kahak County and renamed the Central District. Bidhand was transferred to Kermejegan Rural District created in the same district.
