= Shahzadeh Ebrahim =

Village in Qom province, Iran

Shahzadeh Ebrahim Persian: شاهزاده ابراهيم
- Village
- Location within Iran
- Coordinates: 34°25′23″N 50°55′04″E
- Country: Iran
- Province: Qom
- County: Kahak
- District: Central
- Rural District: Kahak

Population (2016)
  - Total: 128
- Time zone: UTC+3:30 (IRST)

Shahzadeh Ebrahim (Persian: شاهزاده ابراهيم) (Note: Also romanized as Shāhzādeh Ebrāhīm) is a village in Kahak Rural District of the Central District (Note: Formerly Nofel Loshato District and then Kahak District) in Kahak County, Qom province, Iran.

== Demographics ==
=== Population ===
At the time of the 2006 National Census, the village's population was 129 in 44 households, when it was in Kahak District (Note: Formerly Nofel Loshato District, renamed the Central District of Kahak County) of Qom County. The following census in 2011 counted 125 people in 41 households. The 2016 census measured the population of the village as 128 people in 46 households.

In 2021, the district was separated from the county in the establishment of Kahak County and renamed the Central District.
