= Sarm, Iran =

Village in Qom province, Iran

Sarm Persian: صرم
- Village
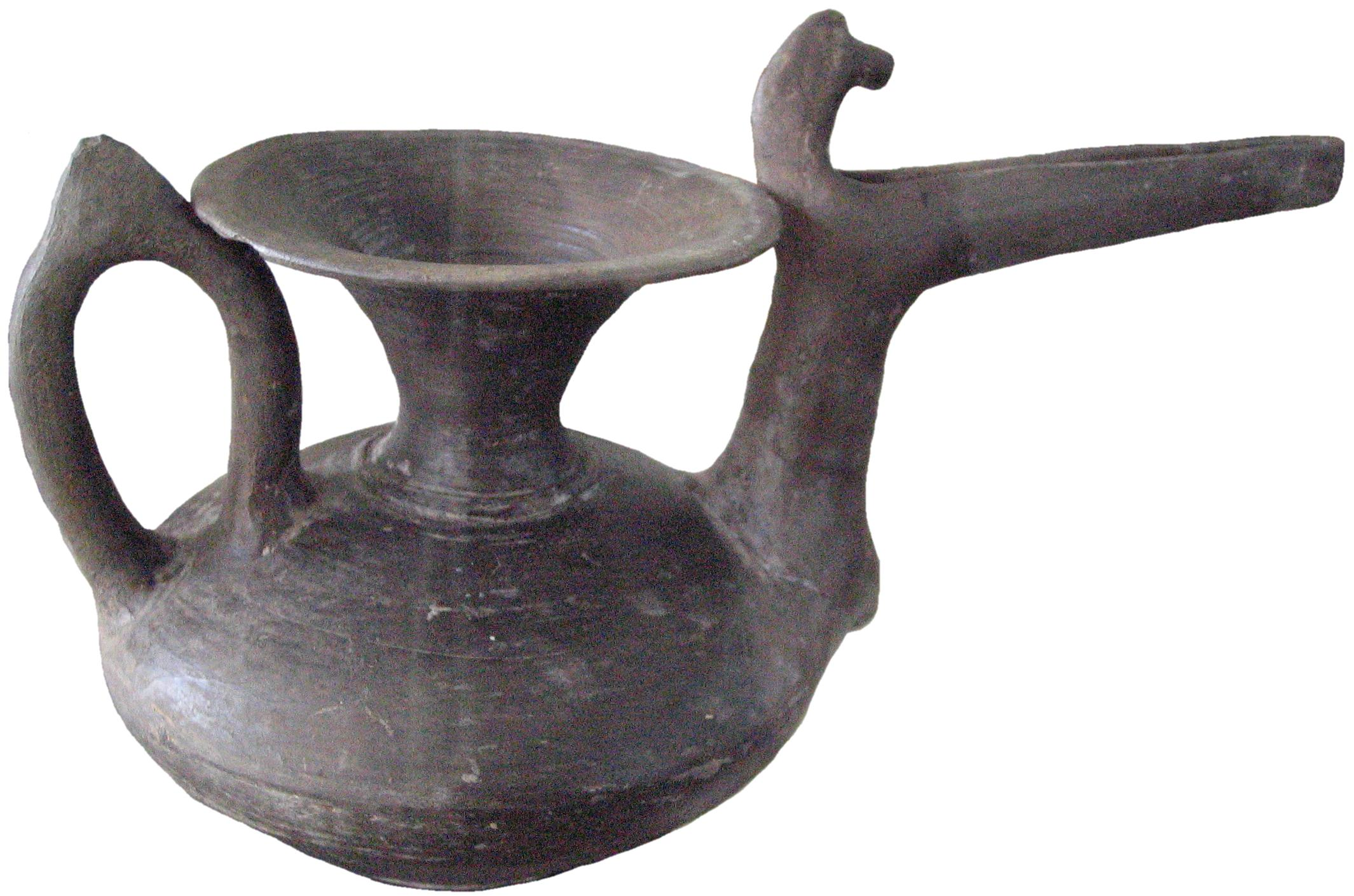
- First millennium BC pottery vessel excavated in the village of Sarm

- Location within Iran
- Coordinates: 34°29′29″N 50°56′28″E
- Country: Iran
- Province: Qom
- County: Kahak
- District: Central
- Rural District: Kermejegan

Population (2016)
  - Total: 2,262
- Time zone: UTC+3:30 (IRST)

Sarm (Persian: صرم) (Note: Also romanized as Şaram and Şarm; also known as Şarmābād) is a village in Kermejegan Rural District of the Central District (Note: Formerly Nofel Loshato District and then Kahak District) in Kahak County, Qom province, Iran.

== Demographics ==
=== Population ===
At the time of the 2006 National Census, the village's population was 2,002 in 508 households, when it was in Kahak Rural District of Kahak District (Note: Formerly Nofel Loshato District, renamed the Central District of Kahak County) in Qom County. The following census in 2011 counted 2,134 people in 245 households. The 2016 census measured the population of the village as 2,262 people in 661 households.

In 2021, the district was separated from the county in the establishment of Kahak County and renamed the Central District. Sarm was transferred to Kermejegan Rural District created in the same district.
