= Siru, Qom =

Village in Qom province, Iran

Siru Persian: سيرو
- Village
- Location within Iran
- Coordinates: 34°25′08″N 50°53′33″E
- Country: Iran
- Province: Qom
- County: Kahak
- District: Central
- Rural District: Kahak

Population (2016)
  - Total: 814
- Time zone: UTC+3:30 (IRST)

Siru (Persian: سيرو) (Note: Also romanized as Sīrū) is a village in Kahak Rural District of the Central District (Note: Formerly Nofel Loshato District and then Kahak District) in Kahak County, Qom province, Iran.

== Demographics ==
=== Population ===
At the time of the 2006 National Census, the village's population was 837 in 247 households, when it was in Kahak District (Note: Formerly Nofel Loshato District, renamed the Central District of Kahak County) of Qom County. The following census in 2011 counted 890 people in 270 households. The 2016 census measured the population of the village as 814 people in 263 households.

In 2021, the district was separated from the county in the establishment of Kahak County and renamed the Central District.
