= Kermejegan =

Village in Qom province, Iran

Kermejegan Persian: کرمجگان
- Village
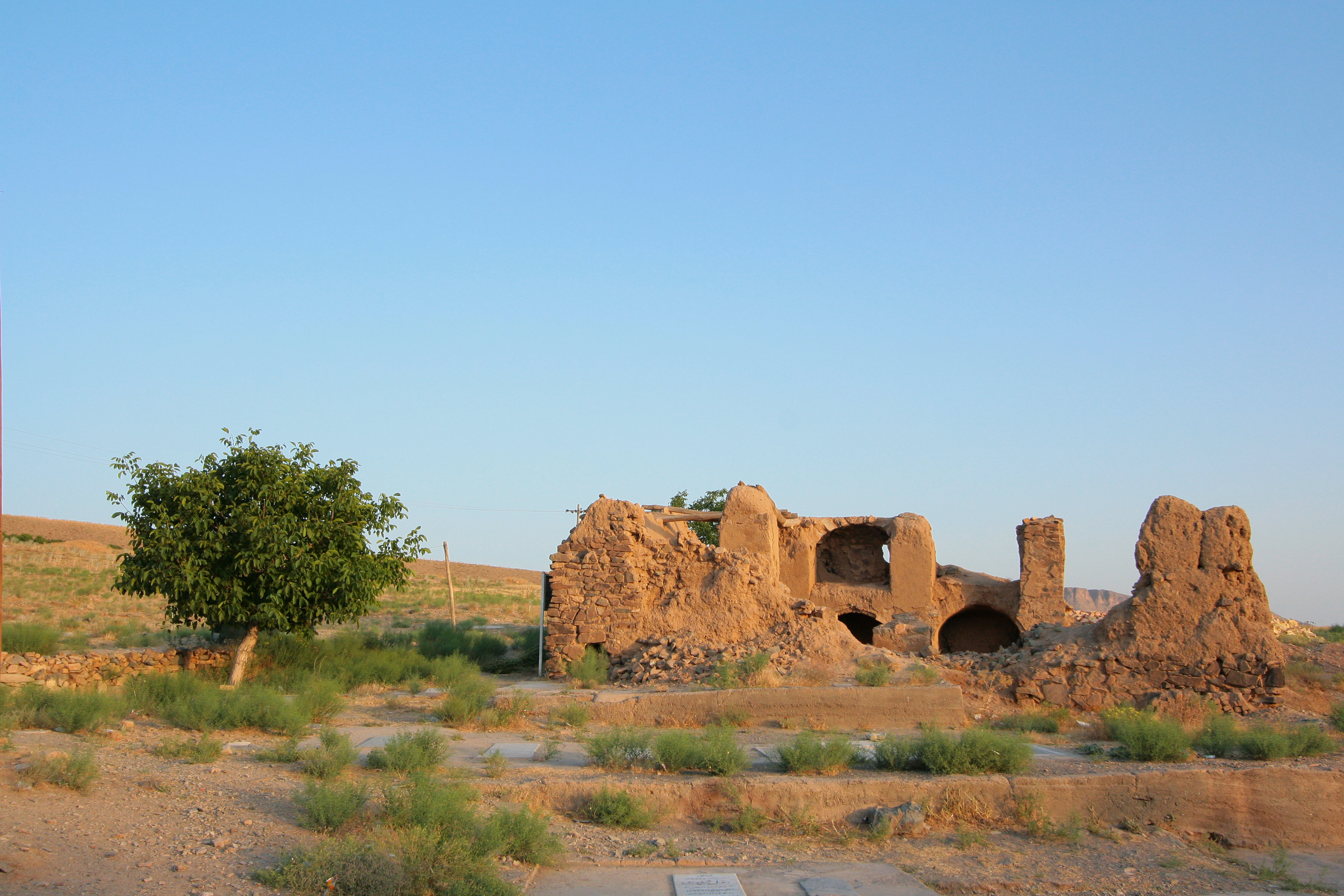
- The Kermejegan Fire Temple dates back to the Sassanid period, located in the village of Kermejegan

- Location within Iran
- Coordinates: 34°17′28″N 50°50′18″E
- Country: Iran
- Province: Qom
- County: Kahak
- District: Central
- Rural District: Kermejegan

Population (2016)
  - Total: 3,082
- Time zone: UTC+3:30 (IRST)

Kermejegan (Persian: کرمجگان) (Note: Also romanized as Karmejegān, Kermajegān, and Kermejgān; also known as Garmachegān, Harmajehgān, and Karamjakan) is a village in, and the capital of, Kermejegan Rural District in the Central District (Note: Formerly Nofel Loshato District and then Kahak District) of Kahak County, Qom province, Iran.

== Demographics ==
=== Population ===
At the time of the 2006 National Census, the village's population was 1,643 in 506 households, when it was in Kahak Rural District of Kahak District (Note: Formerly Nofel Loshato District, renamed the Central District of Kahak County) in Qom County. The following census in 2011 counted 1,408 people in 464 households. The 2016 census measured the population of the village as 3,082 people in 1,001 households, the most populous in its rural district.

In 2021, the district was separated from the county in the establishment of Kahak County and renamed the Central District. Kermejegan was transferred to Kermejegan Rural District created in the same district.
