= Qobad Bazn =

Village in Qom province, Iran

Qobad Bazn Persian: قبادبزن
- Village
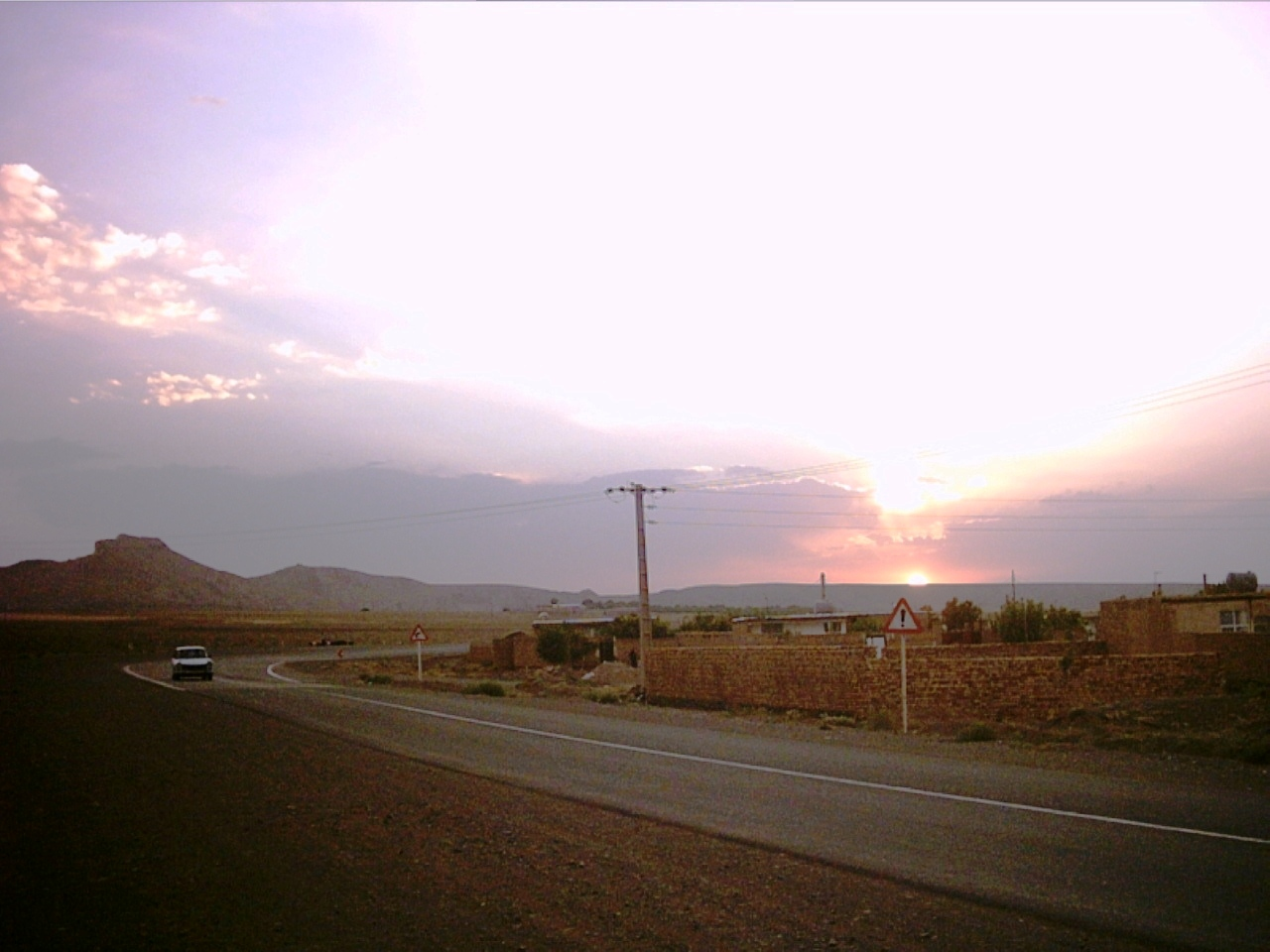
- Landscape near the village of Qobad Bazn

- Location within Iran
- Coordinates: 34°21′29″N 50°52′06″E
- Country: Iran
- Province: Qom
- County: Kahak
- District: Central
- Rural District: Kahak

Population (2016)
  - Total: 649
- Time zone: UTC+3:30 (IRST)

Qobad Bazn (Persian: قبادبزن) (Note: Also romanized as Qobād Bazn and Qobādbezan) is a village in Kahak Rural District of the Central District (Note: Formerly Nofel Loshato District and then Kahak District) in Kahak County, Qom province, Iran.

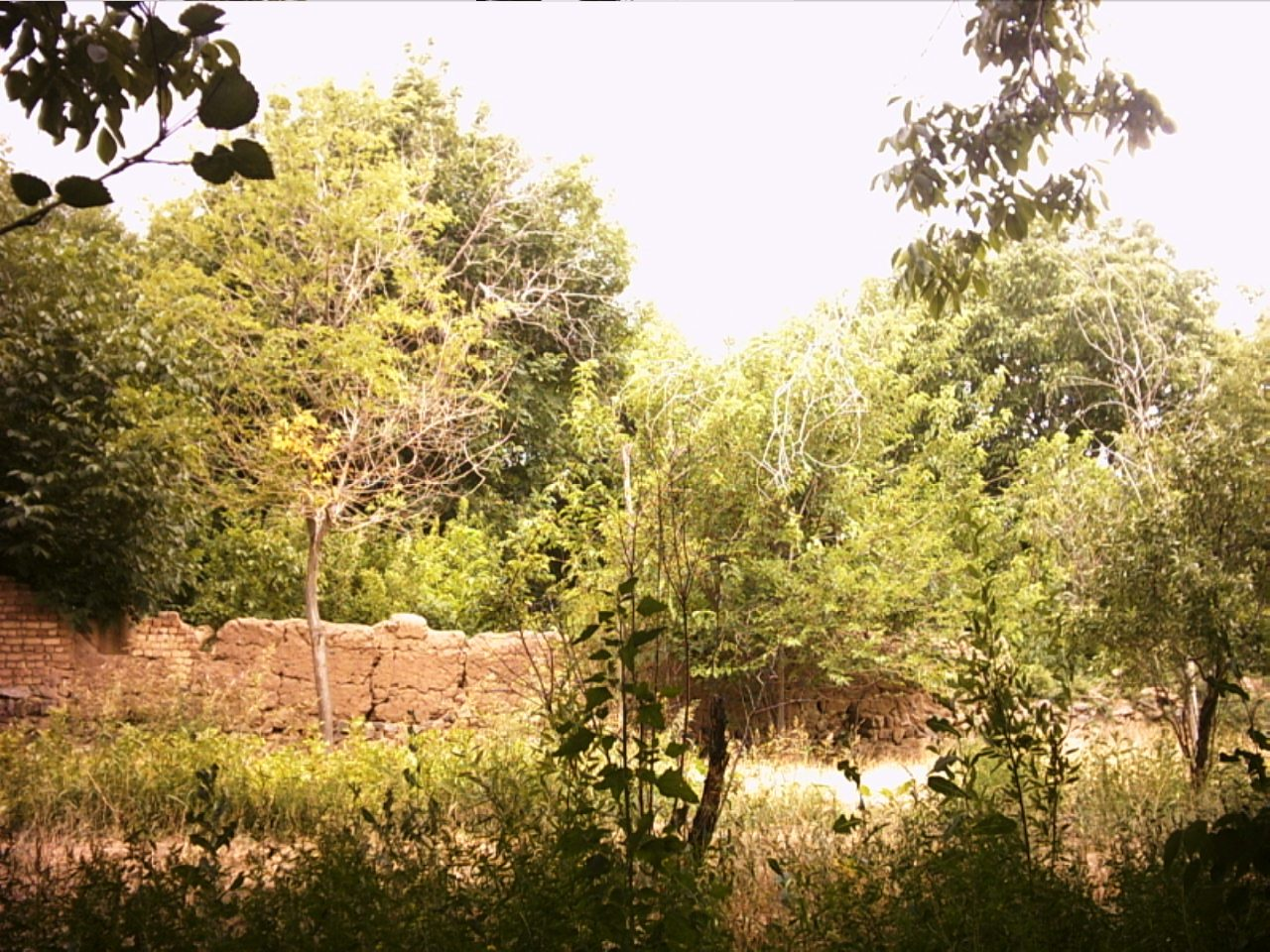
A garden in Qobad Bazn

There is a shrine (Shahzade Mohsen) and mosque in Qobad Bazn village and cemetery in the village's main square and near the shrine and the mosque was. Some names from the village Kavad father of Sassanid king Khosrow G. Anoushirvan know. Also near the village there are some works belonging to the Sassanid coins and statues as well as ancient objects have been discovered.

== Demographics ==
=== Population ===
At the time of the 2006 National Census, the village's population was 613 in 174 households, when it was in Kahak District (Note: Formerly Nofel Loshato District, renamed the Central District of Kahak County) of Qom County. The following census in 2011 counted 598 people in 192 households. The 2016 census measured the population of the village as 649 people in 220 households.

In 2021, the district was separated from the county in the establishment of Kahak County and renamed the Central District.

== See also ==
Media related to Qobadbezan at Wikimedia Commons
