= Fordow =

Fordow or Fordu may refer to:

- Fordo, a village in Qom province, Iran
- Fordow Uranium Enrichment Plant, a facility in Qom province, Iran
