= Kohak =

Kohak may refer to:

- Erazim Kohák, Czech writer
- Kohak, Markazi, a village in Iran
- Kohak, Razavi Khorasan, a village in Iran

== See also ==
- Kahak (disambiguation)
