= Darij =

Darij may refer to:

- Vayrij, Qom Province
- Daraj, South Khorasan Province
