= Verjan =

Village in Qom province, Iran

Verjan Persian: ورجان
- Village
- Location within Iran
- Coordinates: 34°26′07″N 50°52′47″E
- Country: Iran
- Province: Qom
- County: Kahak
- District: Central
- Rural District: Kahak

Population (2016)
  - Total: 1,024
- Time zone: UTC+3:30 (IRST)

Verjan (Persian: ورجان) (Note: Also romanized as Varjān and Verjān; also known as Vīrjān) is a village in, and the capital of, Kahak Rural District in the Central District (Note: Formerly Nofel Loshato District and then Kahak District) of Kahak County, Qom province, Iran. The rural district was previously administered from the city of Kahak. (Note: Formerly Nofel Loshato,)

== Demographics ==
=== Population ===
At the time of the 2006 National Census, the village's population was 763 in 226 households, when it was in Kahak District (Note: Formerly Nofel Loshato District, renamed the Central District of Kahak County) of Qom County. The following census in 2011 counted 1,029 people in 321 households. The 2016 census measured the population of the village as 1,024 people in 327 households.

In 2021, the district was separated from the county in the establishment of Kahak County and renamed the Central District.
