= Bidhand =

Bidhand or Bid Hend or Bid Hand (Persian: بيدهند) may refer to:

- Bid Hend, Isfahan
- Bidhand, Qom
