= SARM =

Sarm or SARM may refer to:

== Places ==
- Sarm, Iran
- Sarm Studios, recording studios in London
- Special Administrative Region of Macau

== Biology and medicine ==
- Selective androgen receptor modulator (SARM), a class of experimental drugs
- SARM1, an enzyme

== Organizations ==
- Saskatchewan Association of Rural Municipalities
- Service d'action et de renseignements militaires, military intelligence service of the Democratic Republic of the Congo, succeeded by DEMIAP
