= Varjan =

Varjan (Persian: ورجان) may refer to:

- Falavarjan
- Verjan
