= Khaveh Rural District =

Rural district in Qom province, Iran

Khaveh Rural District Persian: دهستان خاوه
- Rural District
- Location within Iran
- Coordinates: 34°16′N 50°55′E
- Country: Iran
- Province: Qom
- County: Kahak
- District: Fordo
- Established: 2021
- Capital: Khaveh
- Time zone: UTC+3:30 (IRST)

Khaveh Rural District (Persian: دهستان خاوه) is in Fordo District of Kahak County, Qom province, Iran. Its capital is the village of Khaveh, whose population at the time of the 2016 National Census was 813 in 264 households.

== History ==
In 2021, Kahak District (Note: Formerly Nofel Loshato District, renamed the Central District of Kahak County) was separated from Qom County in the establishment of Kahak County and renamed the Central District. The new county was divided into two districts of two rural districts each, with Kahak as its capital and only city at the time. Khaveh Rural District was created in the new Fordo District.

== Other villages in the rural district ==
- Fordo
- Meyyem
- Tireh
- Veyrij
