= Neauphle-le-Château =

- Commune
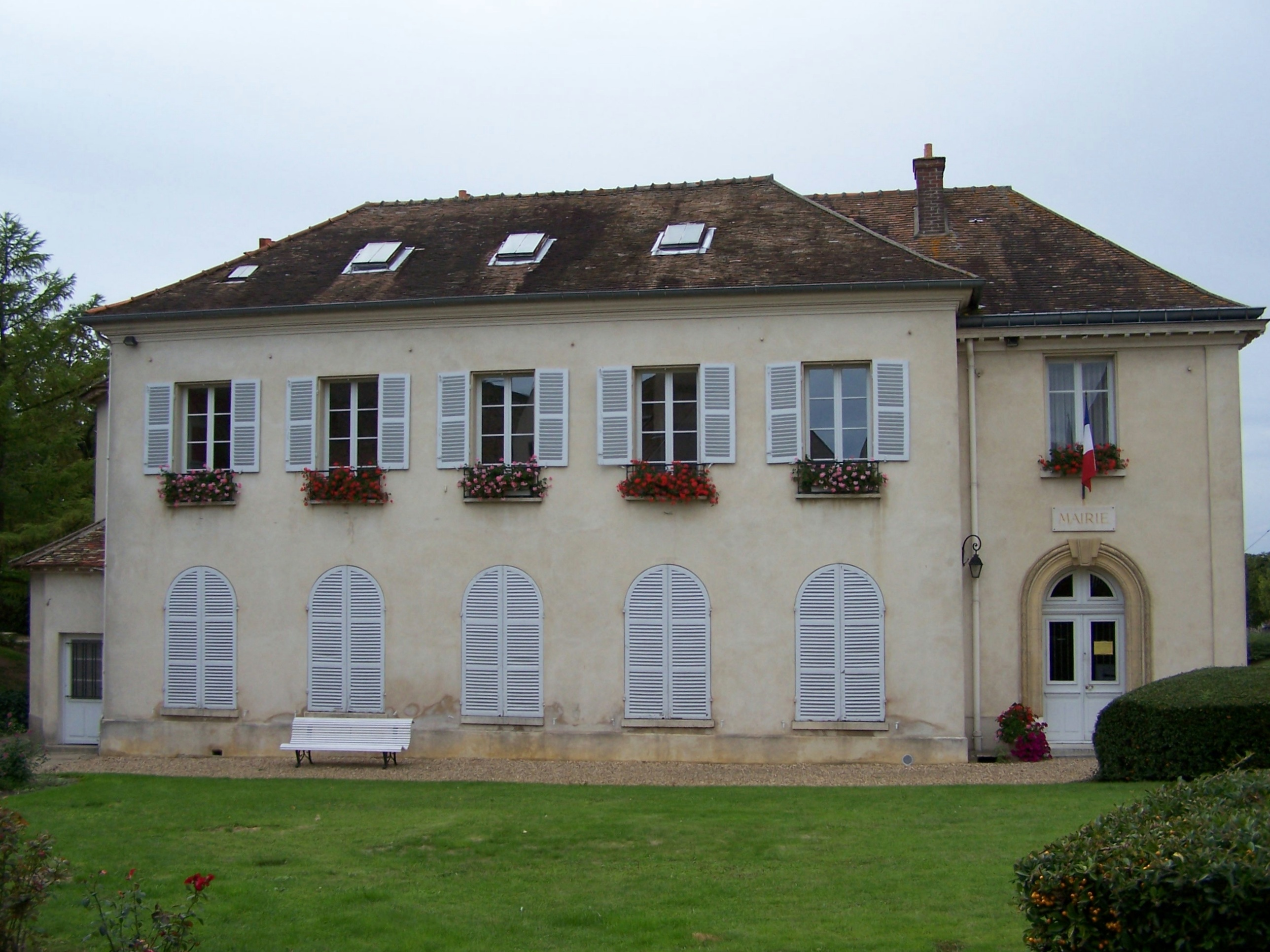
- Town hall

- Coat of arms
- Location of Neauphle-le-Château
- Location within France Location within Île-de-France (region)
- Coordinates: 48°48′55″N 1°54′11″E
- Country: France
- Region: Île-de-France
- Department: Yvelines
- Arrondissement: Rambouillet
- Canton: Aubergenville
- Intercommunality: CC Cœur d'Yvelines

Government
  - Mayor (2020–2026): Élisabeth Sandjivy (DVD)
- Area^{1}: 2.15 km^{2} (0.83 sq mi)
- Elevation: 170 m (560 ft)
- Highest elevation: 172 m (564 ft)
- Lowest elevation: 92 m (302 ft)
- Population (2023): 3,250
  - Density: 1,510/km^{2} (3,920/sq mi)
- Demonym: Neauphléens
- Time zone: UTC+01:00 (CET)
  - Summer (DST): UTC+02:00 (CEST)
- INSEE/Postal code: 78442 /78640
- Website: www.neauphle-le-chateau.com
- ^{1} French Land Register data, which excludes lakes, ponds, glaciers > 1 km^{2} (0.386 sq mi or 247 acres) and river estuaries.

Neauphle-le-Château (French pronunciation: [nofl lə ʃɑto]; lit. 'Neauphle-the-Castle') is a commune in the Yvelines department in the Île-de-France region in north-central France.

== History ==
Neauphle-le-Château gained international fame in 1978 when, on 8 October, Iranian Islamic leader Ayatollah Ruhollah Khomeini rented and moved into a house there following his exile by the regime of Shah Mohammad Reza Pahlavi in the midst of the Iranian Revolution, and after being deported from Iraq where he was taking refuge amongst the Shia community.

The Ayatollah continued to reside there until the following year when he returned to Iran following the collapse of the Shah's regime and later became Iran's Supreme Leader. Due to the Ayatollah's time residing in Neauphle-le-Château, the street in Tehran on which the French Embassy in Iran is located and was previously known as Faranseh (France) street, is now renamed after the village. The small town of Kahak south of the city of Qom was also renamed "Nufeloshato" in the memory of the French village. The property where he resided, at 23 Route de Chevreuse, has long been demolished (either by French secret services or supporters of the Shah, according to many locals) and fenced off.

It was also the home of Deanna Durbin, a Hollywood actress, until her death on 17 April 2013. The writer Marguerite Duras lived here in a house which she described as the one in which she had lived the longest.

== Population ==
Historical population
Year	Pop.	±% p.a.
1968	1,558	—
1975	1,952	+3.27%
1982	2,151	+1.40%
1990	2,499	+1.89%
1999	2,771	+1.15%
2007	2,973	+0.88%
2012	3,044	+0.47%
2017	3,373	+2.07%
2023	3,250	−0.62%
Source: INSEE

== Transportation ==
The center of the village is about 2.2 (1.3 mi) km away from the Villiers–Neauphle–Pontchartrain station, served by the Transilien Line N, which connects to Versailles and Paris (Gare Montparnasse).

== See also ==
- Communes of the Yvelines department
