= Kermejegan Rural District =

Rural district in Qom province, Iran

Kermejegan Rural District Persian: دهستان کرمجگان
- Rural District
- Location within Iran
- Coordinates: 34°23′N 50°50′E
- Country: Iran
- Province: Qom
- County: Kahak
- District: Central
- Established: 2021
- Capital: Kermejegan
- Time zone: UTC+3:30 (IRST)

Kermejegan Rural District (Persian: دهستان کرمجگان) is in the Central District (Note: Formerly Nofel Loshato District and then Kahak District) of Kahak County, Qom province, Iran. Its capital is the village of Kermejegan, whose population at the time of the 2016 National Census was 3,082 in 1,001 households.

== History ==
In 2021, Kahak District (Note: Formerly Nofel Loshato District, renamed the Central District of Kahak County) was separated from Qom County in the establishment of Kahak County and renamed the Central District. Kermejegan Rural District was created in the same district.

== Other villages in the rural district ==
- Abarjes
- Bidhand
- Khowrabad
- Sarm
- Venarej
