= Kahak-e Fathabad =

Kahak-e Fathabad كهك فتح اباد
- Village
- Location within Iran
- Coordinates: 29°20′55″N 56°25′29″E
- Country: Iran
- Province: Kerman
- County: Baft
- Bakhsh: Central
- Rural District: Fathabad

Population (2006)
  - Total: 119
- Time zone: UTC+3:30 (IRST)
  - Summer (DST): UTC+4:30 (IRDT)

Kahak-e Fathabad (Persian: كهك فتح اباد, also Romanized as Kahak-e Fatḥābād) is a village in Fathabad Rural District, in the Central District of Baft County, Kerman Province, Iran. At the 2006 census, its population was 119, in 38 families.
