= Kohak, Razavi Khorasan =

Kohak كهك
- Village
- Location within Iran
- Coordinates: 35°47′00″N 57°12′18″E
- Country: Iran
- Province: Razavi Khorasan
- County: Sabzevar
- Bakhsh: Rud Ab
- Rural District: Kuh Hamayi

Population (2006)
  - Total: 57
- Time zone: UTC+3:30 (IRST)
  - Summer (DST): UTC+4:30 (IRDT)

Kohak (Persian: كهك) is a village in Kuh Hamayi Rural District, Rud Ab District, Sabzevar County, Razavi Khorasan Province, Iran. At the 2006 census, its population was 57, in 16 families.
