= Kahak-e Esfij =

Kahak-e Esfij كهك اسفيج
- Village
- Location within Iran
- Coordinates: 29°24′22″N 56°22′39″E
- Country: Iran
- Province: Kerman
- County: Baft
- Bakhsh: Central
- Rural District: Fathabad

Population (2006)
  - Total: 346
- Time zone: UTC+3:30 (IRST)
  - Summer (DST): UTC+4:30 (IRDT)

Kahak-e Esfij (Persian: كهك اسفيج, also Romanized as Kahak-e Esfīj) is a village in Fathabad Rural District, in the Central District of Baft County, Kerman Province, Iran. At the 2006 census, its population was 346, in 89 families.
