= Fordo Rural District =

Rural district in Qom province, Iran

Fordo Rural District Persian: دهستان فردو
- Rural District
- Location within Iran
- Coordinates: 34°18′N 50°58′E
- Country: Iran
- Province: Qom
- County: Kahak
- District: Fordo
- Established: 1987
- Capital: Dastgerd

Population (2016)
  - Total: 3,482
- Time zone: UTC+3:30 (IRST)

Fordo Rural District (Persian: دهستان فردو) is in Fordo District of Kahak County, Qom province, Iran. Its capital is the village of Dastgerd. The previous capital of the rural district was the village of Fordo, now in Khaveh Rural District.

== Demographics ==
=== Population ===
At the time of the 2006 National Census, the rural district's population (as a part of Kahak District (Note: Formerly Nofel Loshato District, renamed the Central District of Kahak County) in Qom County) was 2,265 in 701 households. There were 2,516 inhabitants in 844 households at the following census of 2011. The 2016 census measured the population of the rural district as 3,482 in 1,186 households. The most populous of its eight villages was Fordo (now in Khaveh Rural District), with 839 people.

In 2021, the district was separated from the county in the establishment of Kahak County and renamed the Central District. The rural district was transferred to the new Fordo District.

=== Other villages in the rural district ===
- Emamzadeh Esmail
- Veshnavah
