= Kahak Rural District =

Rural district in Qom province, Iran

Kahak Rural District Persian: دهستان كهك
- Rural District
- Location within Iran
- Coordinates: 34°24′N 50°58′E
- Country: Iran
- Province: Qom
- County: Kahak
- District: Central
- Established: 1987
- Capital: Verjan

Population (2016)
  - Total: 12,269
- Time zone: UTC+3:30 (IRST)

Kahak Rural District (Persian: دهستان كهك) is in the Central District (Note: Formerly Nofel Loshato District and then Kahak District) of Kahak County, Qom province, Iran. Its capital is the village of Verjan. The rural district was previously administered from the city of Kahak. (Note: Formerly Nofel Loshato,)

== Demographics ==
=== Population ===
At the time of the 2006 National Census, the rural district's population (as a part of Kahak District (Note: Formerly Nofel Loshato District, renamed the Central District of Kahak County) in Qom County) was 9,590 in 2,696 households. There were 9,813 inhabitants in 2,935 households at the following census of 2011. The 2016 census measured the population of the rural district as 12,269 in 3,826 households. The most populous of its 10 villages was Kermejegan (now in Kermejegan Rural District of Fordo District), with 3,082 people.

In 2021, the district was separated from the county in the establishment of Kahak County and renamed the Central District.

=== Other villages in the rural district ===
- Qobad Bazn
- Shahzadeh Ebrahim
- Siru
