= Fordo District =

District in Qom province, Iran

Fordo District Persian: بخش فردو
- District
- Location within Iran
- Coordinates: 34°16′N 50°56′E
- Country: Iran
- Province: Qom
- County: Kahak
- Established: 2021
- Capital: Fordo
- Time zone: UTC+3:30 (IRST)

Fordo District (Persian: بخش فردو) is in Kahak County, Qom province, Iran. Its capital is the village of Fordo, whose population at the time of the 2016 National Census was 839 in 303 households.

== History ==
In 2021, Kahak District (Note: Formerly Nofel Loshato District, renamed the Central District of Kahak County) was separated from Qom County in the establishment of Kahak County and renamed the Central District. The new county was divided into two districts of two rural districts each, with Kahak as its capital and only city at the time.

== Demographics ==
=== Administrative Divisions ===
Fordo District
Administrative divisions
Fordo Rural District
Khaveh Rural District (Note: Established after the 2016 census)
