= Kahak, Qom =

City in Qom province, Iran

Kahak Persian: كهك
- City
- Location within Iran
- Coordinates: 34°23′48″N 50°51′56″E
- Country: Iran
- Province: Qom
- County: Kahak
- District: Central
- Established as a city: 1996

Population (2016)
  - Total: 4,837
- Time zone: UTC+3:30 (IRST)

Kahak (Persian: کهک) (Note: Also known as Kahak-e Qom (کهک قم); formerly Nofel Loshato,) is a city in the Central District (Note: Formerly Nofel Loshato District and then Kahak District) of Kahak County, Qom province, Iran, serving as capital of both the county and the district. It was also the administrative center for Kahak Rural District until its capital was transferred to the village of Verjan. The village of Kahak was converted to a city in 1996.

== Demographics ==
=== Population ===
At the time of the 2006 National Census, the city's population was 2,766 in 797 households, when it was in Kahak District (Note: Formerly Nofel Loshato District, renamed the Central District of Kahak County) of Qom County. The following census in 2011 counted 2,906 people in 883 households. The 2016 census measured the population of the city as 4,837 people in 1,480 households.

In 2021, the district was separated from the county in the establishment of Kahak County and renamed the Central District.
