= Kahak County =

County in Qom province, Iran

Kahak County Persian: شهرستان کهک
- County
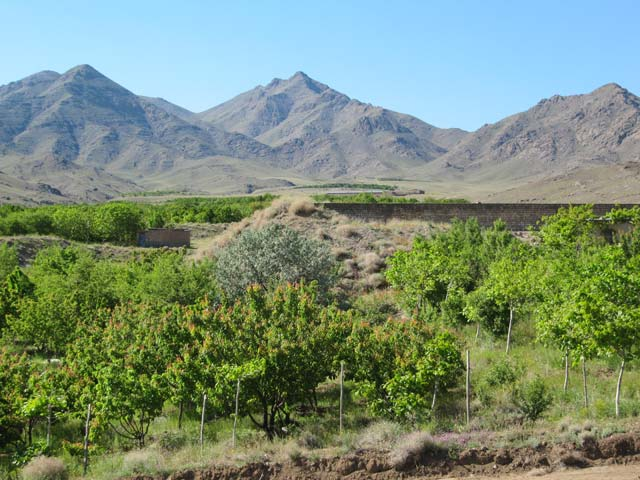
- The village of Khaveh

- Location of Kahak County in Qom province (pink)

- Location of Qom province in Iran
- Coordinates: 34°21′N 50°54′E
- Country: Iran
- Province: Qom
- Established: 2021
- Capital: Kahak
- Districts: Central, Fordo
- Time zone: UTC+3:30 (IRST)

Kahak County (Persian: شهرستان کهک) is in Qom province, Iran. Its capital is the city of Kahak, (Note: Formerly Nofel Loshato) whose population at the time of the 2016 National Census was 4,837 in 1,480 households.

== History ==
In 2021, Kahak District (Note: Formerly Nofel Loshato District, renamed the Central District of Kahak County) was separated from Qom County in the establishment of Kahak County, which was divided into two districts of two rural districts each, with Kahak as its capital and only city at the time.

== Demographics ==
=== Administrative divisions ===
Kahak County's administrative structure is shown in the following table.

Kahak County
Administrative Divisions
Central District (Note: Formerly Nofel Loshato District and then Kahak District of Qom County)
Kahak RD
Kermejegan RD (Note: Established after the 2016 census)
Kahak (city)
Fordo District
Fordo RD
Khaveh RD
RD = Rural District

== See also ==
Media related to Kahak County at Wikimedia Commons
