= Central District (Kahak County) =

District in Qom province, Iran

Central District (Kahak County) Persian: بخش مرکزی شهرستان کهک
- District
- Location within Iran
- Coordinates: 34°23′N 50°55′E
- Country: Iran
- Province: Qom
- County: Kahak
- Established: 2021
- Capital: Kahak
- Time zone: UTC+3:30 (IRST)

The Central District of Kahak County (Persian: بخش مرکزی شهرستان کهک) (Note: Formerly Nofel Loshato District and then Kahak District of Qom County) is in Qom province, Iran. Its capital is the city of Kahak. (Note: Formerly Nofel Loshato,)

== History ==
In 2021, Kahak District (Note: Formerly Nofel Loshato District, renamed the Central District of Kahak County) was separated from Qom County in the establishment of Kahak County, which was divided into two districts of two rural districts each, with Kahak as its capital and only city at the time.

== Demographics ==
=== Population ===
At the time of the 2006 National Census, the district's population was 14,621, in 4,194 households. The following census in 2011 counted 15,235 people in 4,662 households. The 2016 census measured the population of the district as 20,588 in 6,492 households.

=== Administrative divisions ===
Central District (Kahak County) (Note: As Nofel Loshato District of Qom County at the 2006, 2011, and 2016 censuses)
Administrative Divisions	2006	2011	2016
Fordo RD (Note: Transferred to Fordo District after the 2016 census)	2,265	2,516	3,482
Kahak RD	9,590	9,813	12,269
Kermejegan RD (Note: Established after the 2016 census)			
Kahak (city)	2,766	2,906	4,837
Total	14,621	15,235	20,588
RD = Rural District
