= Vehicle registration plates of Qom =

Qom vehicle license plates

Qom Province's code is 16. Codes 26 and 36 used to be designated as reserve codes for the province but were later assigned to North Khorasan and Razavi Khorasan respectively after the partition of Khorasan Province.

۱۲ ۳۴۵	۱۶
